= Jia Yueyue and Jia Panpan =

Pair of twin giant pandas (born 2015)

- Species: Giant panda
- Sex: Male (Jia Panpan); Female (Jia Yueyue)
- Born: 13 October 2015 (age 11); Toronto Zoo, Toronto, Ontario, Canada
- Residence: Toronto Zoo (2015–2018); Calgary Zoo (2018–2020); Chengdu Research Base of Giant Panda Breeding (2020–present)
- Weight: 40 lb (Jia Yueyue; 18 months); 38 lb (Jia Panpan; 18 months)

Jia Yueyue (Chinese: 加悅悅; pinyin: Jiā yuè yuè; lit. 'Canadian Joy') and Jia Panpan (Chinese: 加盼盼; pinyin: Jiā pàn pàn; lit. 'Canadian Hope') are twin giant pandas (Ailuropoda melanoleuca) born at the Toronto Zoo on 13 October 2015, to Da Mao and Er Shun. They were the first giant pandas to be born in Canada, resulting from one of two artificial insemination procedures. Jia Yueyue, Jia Panpan, Er Shun and Da Mao were on public exhibit at the zoo from 12 March 2016 to 18 March 2018, when they were moved to Calgary Zoo. The twins have since left Canada and now reside at the Chengdu Research Base of Giant Panda Breeding.

== Life and family ==
Jia Yueyue and Jia Panpan were born on 13 October 2015 at the Toronto Zoo to mother, Er Shun, and father, Da Mao, who arrived at the zoo in March 2013 as part of panda diplomacy, which involved a ten-year loan from the Chinese Association of Zoological Gardens. They were the first giant pandas to be born in Canada, and only the second giant panda twins to survive infancy in North America. Their birth was the result of one of two artificial insemination procedures overnight from 13 to 14 May 2015. Jia Yueyue and Jia Panpan are great-grandchildren of Pan Pan, who, at 31, was the longest-living male giant panda to have lived in captivity.

Their Chinese names, which mean Canadian Hope (Jia Panpan (Chinese: 加盼盼)) and Canadian Joy (Jia Yueyue (加悅悅)), were revealed on 7 March 2016. Their names were chosen by the public from a list of seven possible sets. The prime minister of Canada, Justin Trudeau, the premier of Ontario, Kathleen Wynne, and the mayor of Toronto, John Tory, attended their naming ceremony at the zoo. When Jia Yueyue and Jia Panpan were 18 months old, they weighed 38 pounds and 40 pounds, respectively.

== Canada and departure ==
The pandas went on public exhibit at the Toronto Zoo on 12 March 2016, and the last day that the giant pandas were viewable at the Toronto Zoo was 18 March 2018, when they, along with Er Shun and Da Mao, were moved to Calgary Zoo. At Calgary Zoo, a $14.4 million habitat with over 20,000 square feet of both outdoor and indoor space known as Panda Passage was opened on 7 May 2018. The twins were supposed to live in Calgary Zoo until late 2019, but their stay was extended to early 2020.

Jia Yueyue and Jia Panpan arrived in the Chengdu Research Base of Giant Panda Breeding in January 2020. After their arrival, the COVID-19 pandemic in China made it difficult for Canada to get bamboo for Da Mao and Er Shun, who lived in Calgary Zoo until 2023.

== See also ==
- List of individual giant pandas
