= Da Mao and Er Shun =

Pair of giant pandas

- Da Mao and Er Shun in 2017
- Species: Giant panda
- Residence: Toronto Zoo (2013–2018); Calgary Zoo (2018–2020)
- Offspring: Jia Yueyue and Jia Panpan
- Da Mao
- Sex: Male
- Born: September 1, 2008 (age 18); Chengdu Research Base of Giant Panda Breeding, China
- Er Shun
- Sex: Female
- Born: August 10, 2007 (age 19); Chongqing Zoo, China

Da Mao (Chinese: 大毛; pinyin: Dàmáo; lit. 'First of Mao'; born September 1, 2008) and Er Shun (Chinese: 二顺; pinyin: Èr shùn; lit. 'Double Smoothness'; born August 10, 2007) are two giant pandas. They were brought to Canada on March 25, 2013, and were supposed to spend five years each at Toronto Zoo and Calgary Zoo. Prior to departure, Er Shun's sex was unknown, as she had not reached full sexual maturity or undergone blood testing, so she was paired with a female panda from the Chengdu Research Base of Giant Panda Breeding. The female was later switched out for male Da Mao once scientists discovered that Er Shun was female.

Following Er Shun's first estrus, she was artificially inseminated, and after a suspected pseudopregnancy in 2014, Da Mao and Er Shun had two cubs, Jia Yueyue and Jia Panpan, who were born at the Toronto Zoo on October 13, 2015. In May 2020, the Calgary Zoo requested that both pandas be returned to China due to the difficulty of importing bamboo during the COVID-19 pandemic. Er Shun returned to the Chongqing Zoo at the end of November 2020, with her cubs going with Da Mao to the Chengdu Research Base of Giant Panda Breeding at that time.

== Early life ==
Da Mao was born on September 1, 2008, at the Chengdu Research Base of Giant Panda Breeding. His Chinese name means 'first of Mao', as he was his mother's firstborn cub. Er Shun was born on August 10, 2007, to mother Ya Ya (娅娅; Yà yà) and father Ling Ling (灵灵; Líng líng), at Chongqing Zoo. In Chinese, the name Er Shun means 'double smoothness'.

== Time in Canada ==
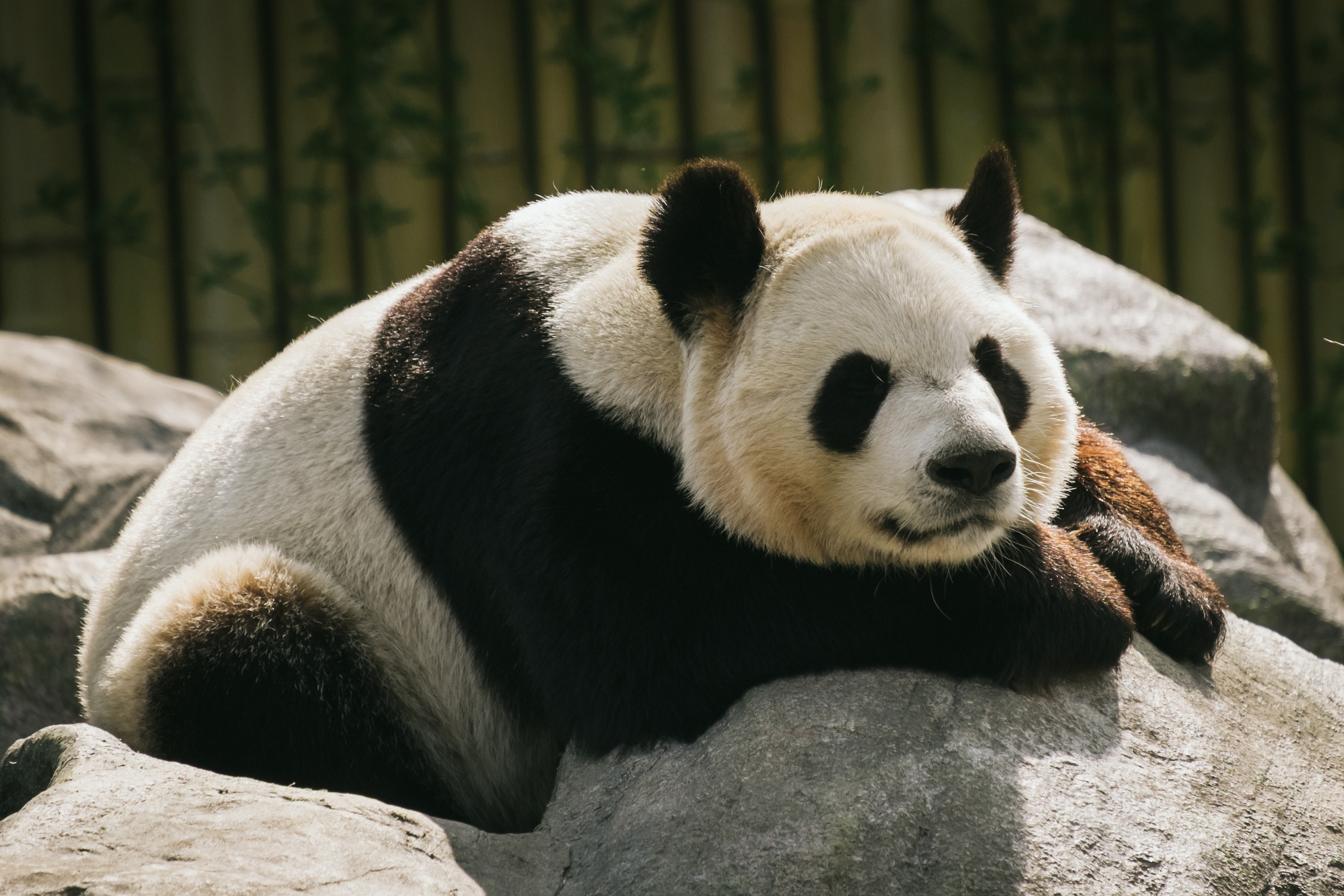
Da Mao in 2014

When plans were first made to bring giant pandas to Canada, Er Shun was believed to be male, and had been paired with a female from the Chengdu Research Base of Giant Panda Breeding for the journey. Months before her departure her true sex was determined and the known female was switched out for male Da Mao. Without blood testing, identifying panda sex is next to impossible until the animals reach full sexual maturity.

Da Mao and Er Shun were brought to Canada on March 25, 2013, as part of a 10-year contract between the federal governments of Canada and China. The two pandas were supposed to spend five years each at Toronto Zoo and Calgary Zoo, but in May 2020, the Calgary Zoo requested that both pandas be returned to China due to the difficulty of importing bamboo during the COVID-19 pandemic. With the pandas' arrival, the Toronto Zoo refurbished its seasonal attraction area into an extensive educational centre - the Giant Panda Interpretive Centre.

=== Breeding attempts ===
In 2014, after her first estrus, Er Shun was artificially inseminated - the first such procedure performed on a panda in Canada. No baby was born in that year and it was believed that Er Shun experienced a pseudopregnancy, a phenomenon common in giant pandas. On October 13, 2015, Er Shun gave birth to two cubs, Jia Yueyue and Jia Panpan, the first giant pandas born in Canada. In Chinese, the cubs' names mean Canadian Joy and Canadian Hope, respectively.

=== Calgary Zoo and COVID-19 ===
On March 23, 2018, Er Shun, her cubs, and Da Mao all left the Toronto Zoo to begin a five-year stay at the Calgary Zoo, under the agreement between the Canadian and Chinese governments. In May 2020, the Calgary Zoo requested that both Er Shun and Da Mao pandas be returned to China due to the difficulty of importing bamboo during the COVID-19 pandemic. Er Shun returned to China at the end of November 2020, with her cubs going with Da Mao to the Chengdu Research Base of Giant Panda Breeding at that time.

== See also ==
- List of individual giant pandas
- List of individual bears
