= Calgary Zoo =

Zoo in Alberta, Canada

Wilder Institute's Calgary Zoo

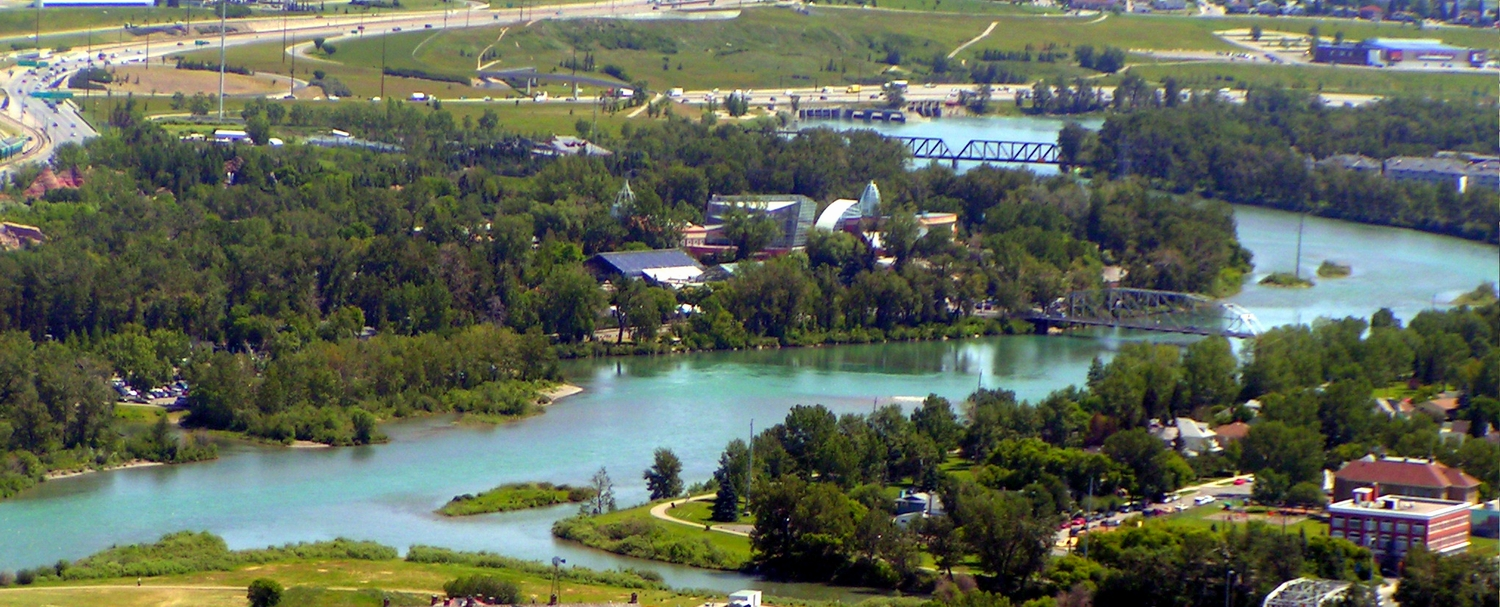
- Wilder Institute's Calgary Zoo on St. George's Island
- Interactive map of Wilder Institute's Calgary Zoo
- 51°02′45″N 114°02′00″W
- Date opened: 9 January 1929
- Location: Calgary, Alberta, Canada
- Land area: 0.3 km^{2} (0.12 sq mi)
- No. of animals: Over 4,000
- No. of species: Over 100
- Annual visitors: 1.54 million
- Memberships: WAZA, AZA, IUCN
- Major exhibits: Penguin Plunge, Land of Lemurs, Wild Canada, Prehistoric Park, Destination Africa, Exploration Asia
- Website: https://www.calgaryzoo.com/

The Wilder Institute's Calgary Zoo is located in Bridgeland, Calgary, Alberta, Canada, just east of the city's downtown and adjacent to the Inglewood and East Village neighborhoods. It is accessible via Calgary's C-Train light rail system, by car via Memorial Drive, and by bicycle and footpath via the Bow River pathway. A large portion of the zoo is located on St. George's Island in the Bow River.

The zoo is operated by the Calgary Zoological Society, an independent not-for-profit organization that is Alberta's oldest registered charity. The AZA-, WAZA-, and formerly CAZA-accredited zoo was among the first in Canada to be accredited by all three associations. It is home to over 1,000 animals, excluding individual fish and insects, and 272 different species. The 125-acre zoo is organized into distinct zones: Destination Africa, Wild Canada (formerly Canadian Wilds), Penguin Plunge, Dorothy Harvie Botanical Gardens and ENMAX Conservatory, Exploration Asia, and Prehistoric Park. The zoo is open every day except for Christmas Day.

As of 2023, it is Canada's most visited zoo. In 2013, the Association of Zoos and Aquariums said "the Calgary Zoo sets itself apart as one of the top zoos in the world." In 2015, the zoo was named one of the top three most respected organizations in Alberta and one of Alberta's 10 most beloved brands.

== History ==
St. George's Island was Calgary's first park, used by the community for picnics, relaxing, and socializing. The first collection of animals began with two mule deer on the island in 1917. The collection expanded with more local wildlife as the popularity amongst park-goers increased. The Calgary Zoological Society was established on 9 January 1929 and took over administration of the facility from the City of Calgary.

Several animals died during floods in June 1929 when St. George's Island was swamped.

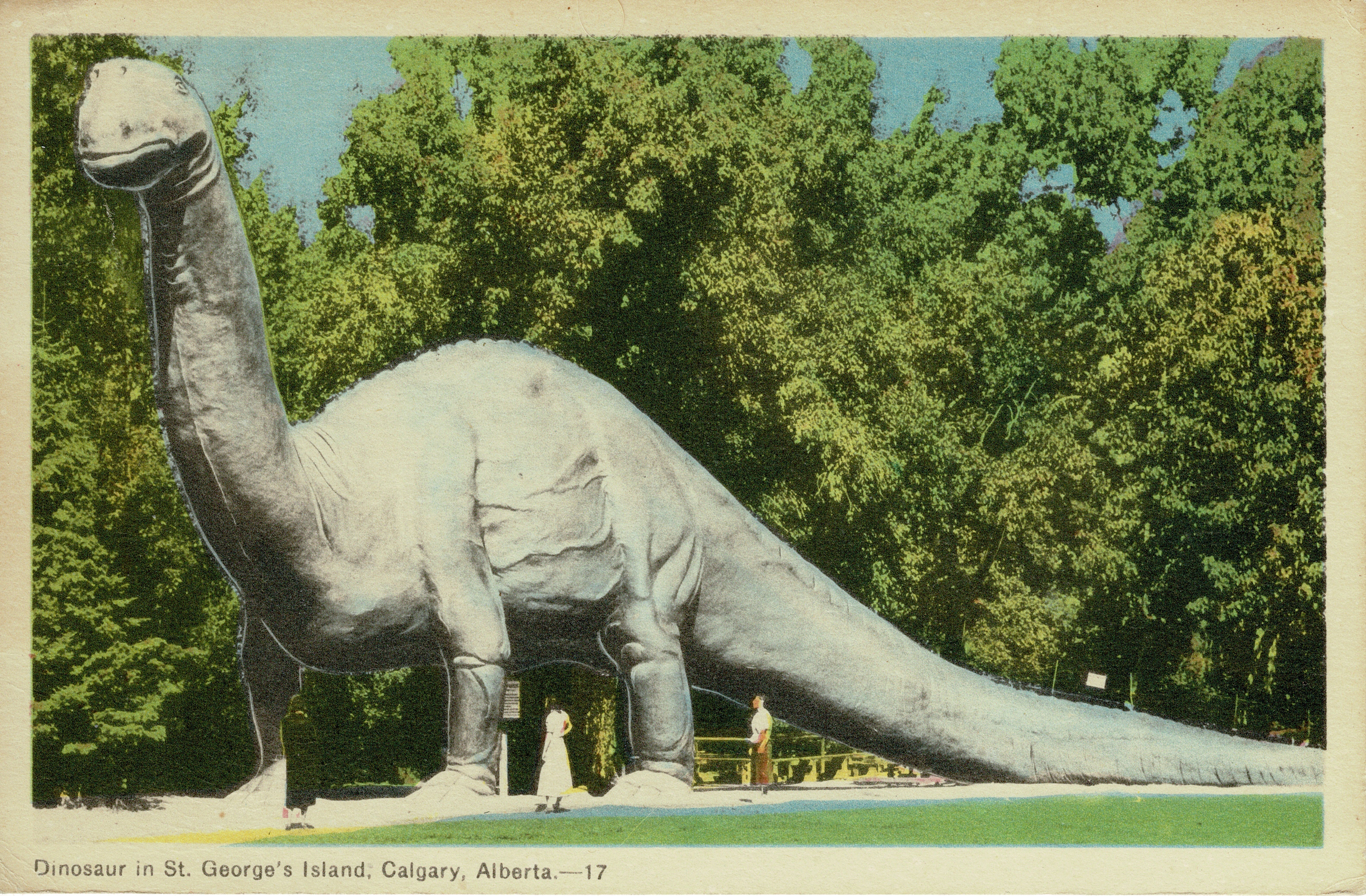
"Dinny", the Zoo's Brontosaurus statue in the 1940s.

In 1937, the closure of the Banff Zoo in Banff National Park led to the transfer of more species and allowed the Calgary Zoo to cement itself as the largest zoological collection in the region.

In 1972, the zoo launched the "Ban the Bars" campaign to modernize its facilities with more natural enclosures.

Destination Africa opened in 2003 to include two new facilities The Rainforest and the African Savannah. The zoo opened Penguin Plunge, an Antarctic penguin addition in 2012.

In April 2013, the Calgary Zoo announced a master plan for rebuilding the zoo over 20 years. The initial focus on the master plan was preparing for the arrival of two giant pandas in 2018 for a five-year stay. Four giant pandas arrived in 2018 after the successful birth of twins at the Toronto Zoo. The cubs left the Calgary Zoo for China in January 2020, followed by their parents in November 2020 due to a lack of bamboo availability during the COVID-19 pandemic.

The Calgary Zoo Foundation rebranded itself as the Wilder Institute and instituted the new joint Wilder Institute and Calgary Zoo branding in 2021. In 2026, this was changed again to Wilder Institute's Calgary Zoo.

In 2025, the Wilder Institute, in collaboration with Parks Canada, University of Alberta, University of Kentucky, and University of California, Los Angeles, announced the discovery of a new species of hairsteak butterfly known as Satyrium curiosolus or Curiously Isolated Hairstreak. The species was previously believed to be an isolated population of Halfmoon Hairstreak butterflies.

=== 2013 flooding ===
The Calgary area suffered extensive flooding in June 2013 resulting in over $50 million in damage to the island section of the Calgary Zoo and parts of its Canadian Wild zone (see 2013 Alberta floods). In a 12-hour period, with flood waters rising, zoo staff managed to move 140 animals to higher ground. In the end, the only animals lost were a number of fish, two peacocks, and a pot-bellied pig. The zoo was closed for most of July 2013; the northern 60 acres of the zoo reopened to the public for August through November. The zoo fully reopened in November 2013 with new animals, exhibits, and features unveiled in 2014, including mandrills and Komodo dragons.

== Destinations ==
=== Destination Africa ===
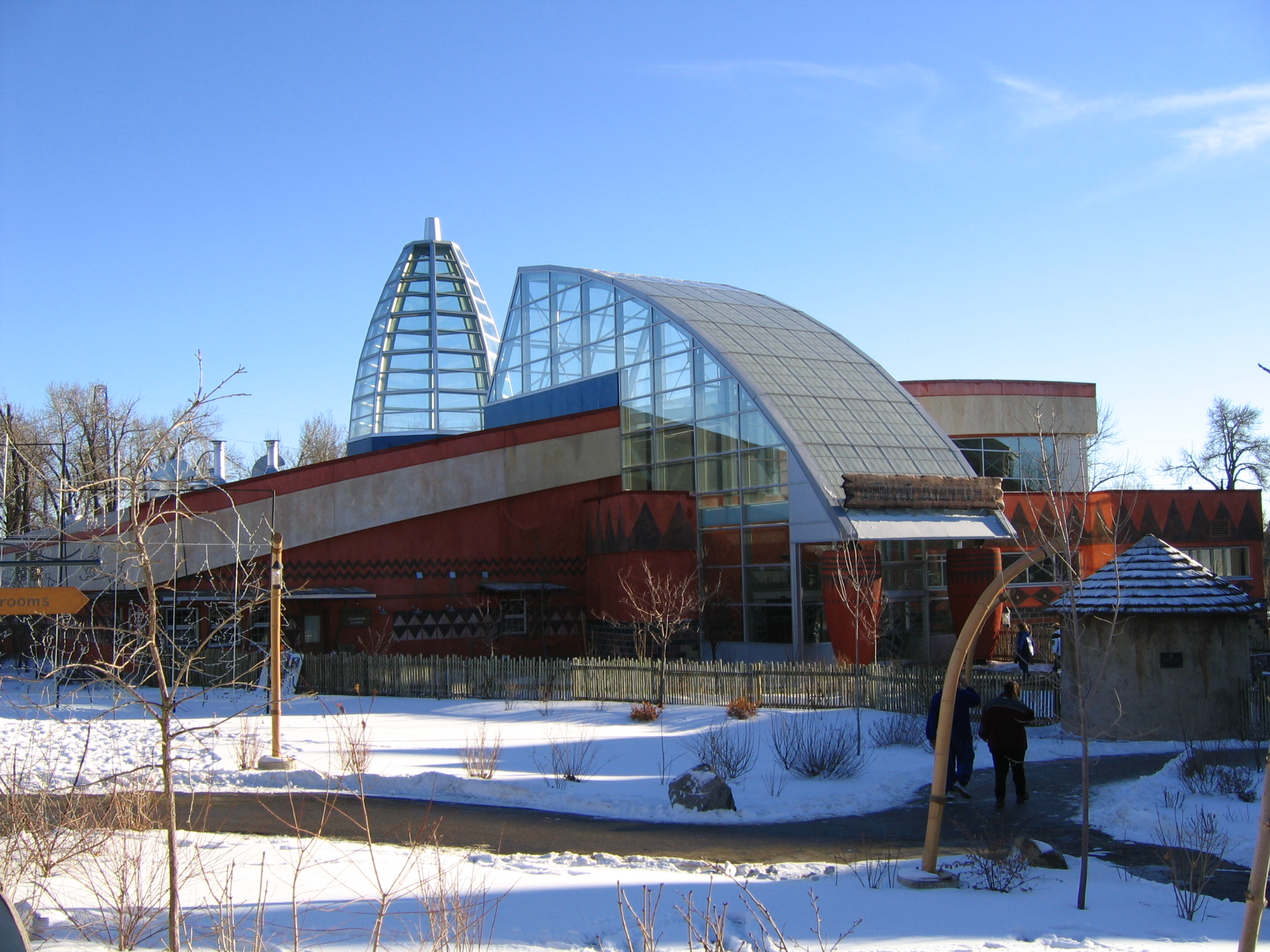
The Destination Africa Savannah Building.

Opened in 2003, the Destination Africa project was among the zoo's most ambitious expansions. The complex of four buildings includes the Rainforest and the African Savannah. The Rainforest occupies 2,900 square metres (31,000 square feet) and features a collection of African rainforest flora and fauna. The African Savannah building is home to hippos, Masai giraffes, red river hogs, and a baobab tree. A 340,000-litre (80,000-gallon) indoor pool for hippos offers view of the creatures underwater.

In the warmer months, the doors lift to connect the building with the rest of the Savannah exhibit, home to Hartmann's mountain zebras, grey crowned cranes and ostriches. Many other animals of the grasslands, including African lions, also reside in the Savannah exhibit. In the Rainforest, there are primates such as western lowland gorillas, eastern black-and-white colobus, and mandrills, and a number of reptiles including leopard tortoises, Malagasy tree boas, and a pair of dwarf crocodiles, as well as an aviary containing various species of African birds.

==== Land Of Lemurs ====
In 2017, the Land of Lemurs was opened to the public, with 3 different species of lemurs residing within; the black-and-white ruffed lemur, the ring-tailed lemur, and the red-fronted lemur.

=== Wild Canada (formerly Canadian Wilds) ===
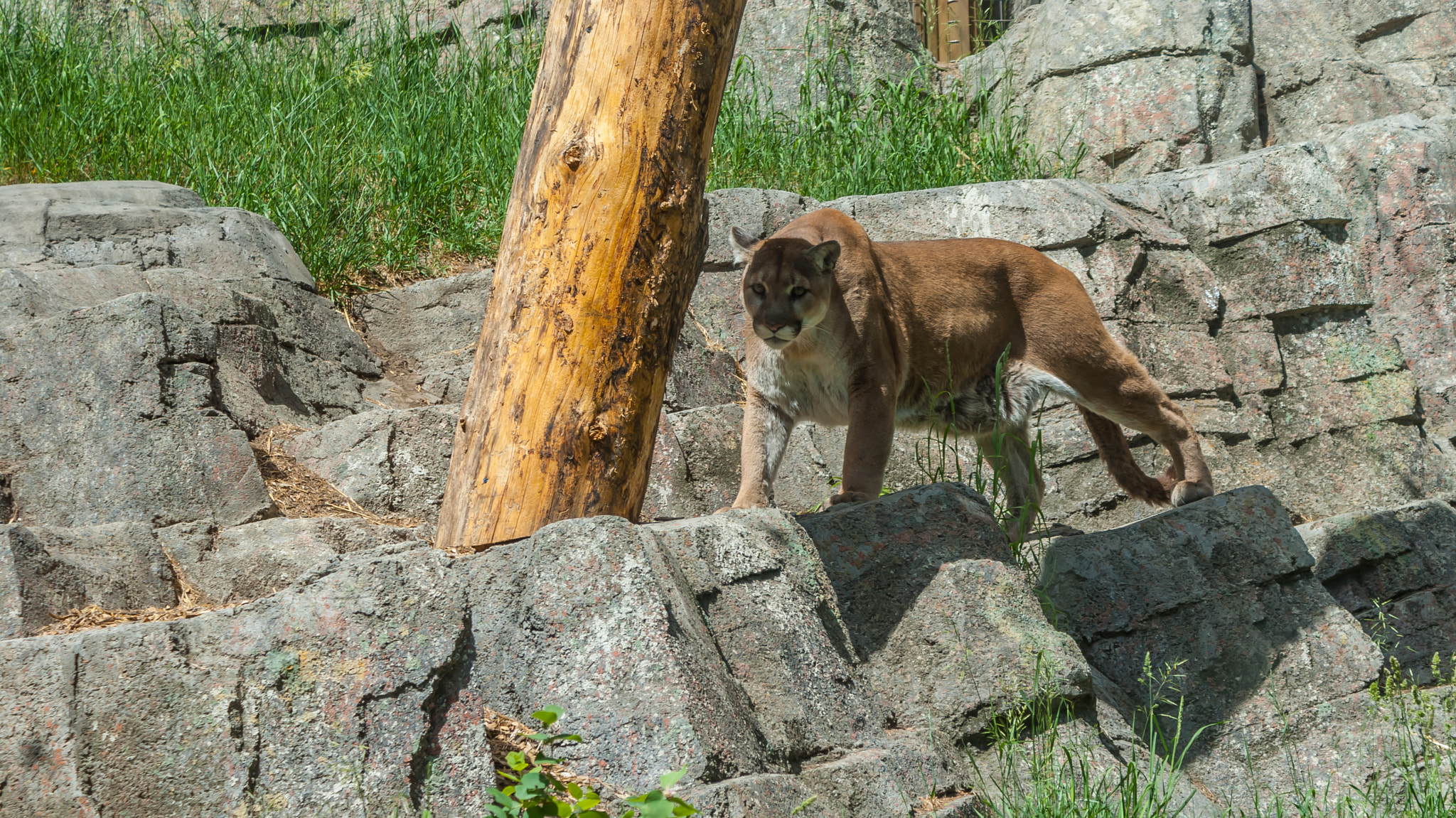
A cougar in the Canadian Wilds.

The Canadian Wilds were built in the 1990s to house the majority of zoo's collection of North American birds and mammals. The area includes outdoor enclosures in three zones: the Aspen Woodlands, the Northern Forest, and the Rocky Mountains. Animals in the enclosures include river otters, caribou, bighorn sheep, mountain goats, grizzly bears, black bears, polar bears, north american porcupine, muskoxen, moose, whooping cranes, black bears, Canada lynx, wood bison, and grey wolves.

==== Jihad Shibley Rocky Mountain Aviary ====
This aviary includes great grey owl and snowy owl.

=== Dorothy Harvie Botanical Gardens and ENMAX Conservatory ===
The outdoor gardens are among the zoo's most popular attractions and include the Dorothy Harvie Gardens. The zoo's sheltered location supports many marginally hardy plant species. The conservatory comprises the indoor component of the zoo's gardens. It includes a number of "themed" areas such as the tropical garden, the rainforest, the arid garden, and the butterfly garden. A number of animals including birds and invertebrates are housed in the conservatory. The ENMAX Conservatory was completely renovated in 2009 and features an increased emphasis on teaching visitors the importance of plants and improving energy efficiency. The Wilder Institute/Calgary Zoo achieved LEED (Leadership in Energy and Environmental Design) Gold in energy conservation and responsible building practices, the first facility of its kind to achieve this level of certification.

=== Exploration Asia (Formerly Eurasia) ===
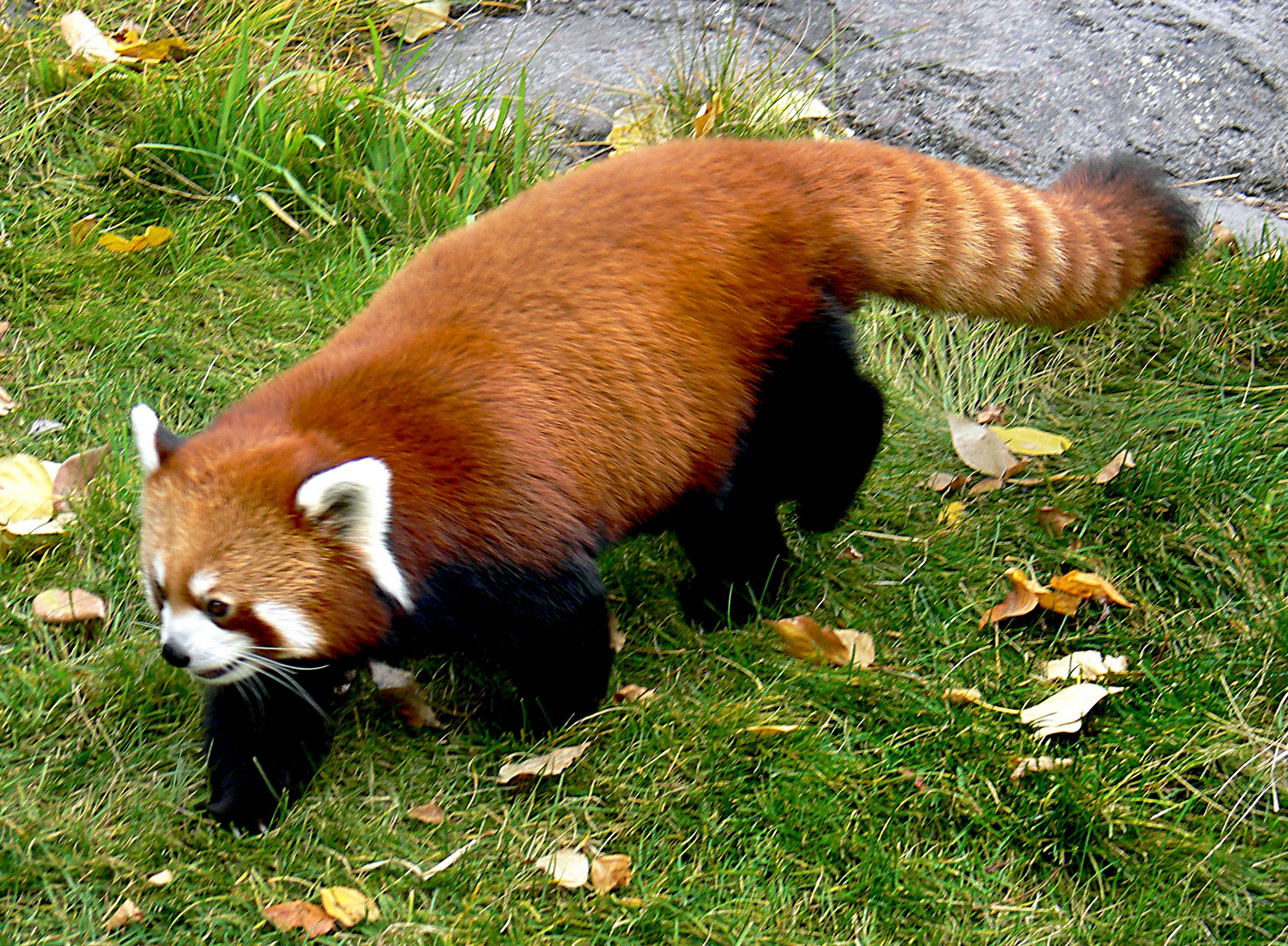
Red panda (Ailurus fulgens) at the zoo.

The western portion of St. George's Island is dedicated to Eurasian animals. Animals in this area include Amur tigers, snow leopards, Pallas's cats, Japanese macaques, red pandas, Japanese serows, Bactrian camels, and Komodo dragons. This section was also home to four giant pandas which debuted in early May 2018. The giant pandas were on loan from the Chengdu Research Base in Chengdu, Sichaun, China. Panda Passage featured adult male Da Mao, cubs Jia Yueyue and Jia Panpan as well as their mother Er Shun. The pandas returned to China because of bamboo supply chain issues arising from COVID-19. Formerly residing in the Panda's habitat area was a herd of Asian elephants (relocated to the Smithsonian National Zoo) and later a male Indian rhinoceros named Sabari (now residing in Safari Niagara, Ontario). The area known as Panda Passage has since been renamed to Gateway to Asia and has seen the addition of Malayan tapir and white-handed gibbons.

In February 2025, the zoo announced a multi-phase redevelopment of the Exploration Asia zone starting with the 'Asia Highlands' phase focussing on species of Southeast Asia, the Eastern Himalayas, and Northeast Asia. The first phase was completed in 2026.

=== Prehistoric Park ===
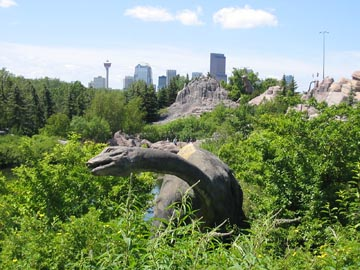
The Prehistoric Park.

The Wilder Institute/Calgary Zoo's six-acre Prehistoric Park features life-sized dinosaurs in their re-created geographical environment, including replicas of an inland sea and volcanic mountain, and more than 100 species of living plants. Dinosaurs include Albertosaurus, Allosaurus, Ankylosaurus, Apatosaurus, Baryonyx, Centrosaurus, Corythosaurus, Deinonychus, Dilophosaurus, Edmontosaurus, Elasmosaurus, Euoplocephalus, Iguanodon, Metriacanthosaurus, Nothosaurus, Omeisaurus, Pachyrhinosaurus, Parasaurolophus, Protoceratops, Pteranodon, Pterosaur, Stegosaurus, Struthiomimus, Styracosaurus, Tanystropheus, Triceratops, Tylosaurus, Tyrannosaurus rex, and Yangchuanosaurus.

=== Penguin Plunge ===
Penguin Plunge and a renovated gift shop were opened in the spring of 2012 and is located at the entrance of the Zoo. The exhibit includes king penguins, Humboldt penguins, gentoo penguins, and rockhopper penguins . Penguin Plunge consists of two main areas, an indoor climate-controlled habitat and an outdoor open-air habitat. In summer, the outdoor exhibit holds the warm-weather South American Humboldt penguins which are housed inside during the winter. On winter days when the temperature is between +10 °C and -25 °C without wind above 20 km/h, the king penguins go on scheduled walks for exercise and enrichment.

=== Other/former animals ===
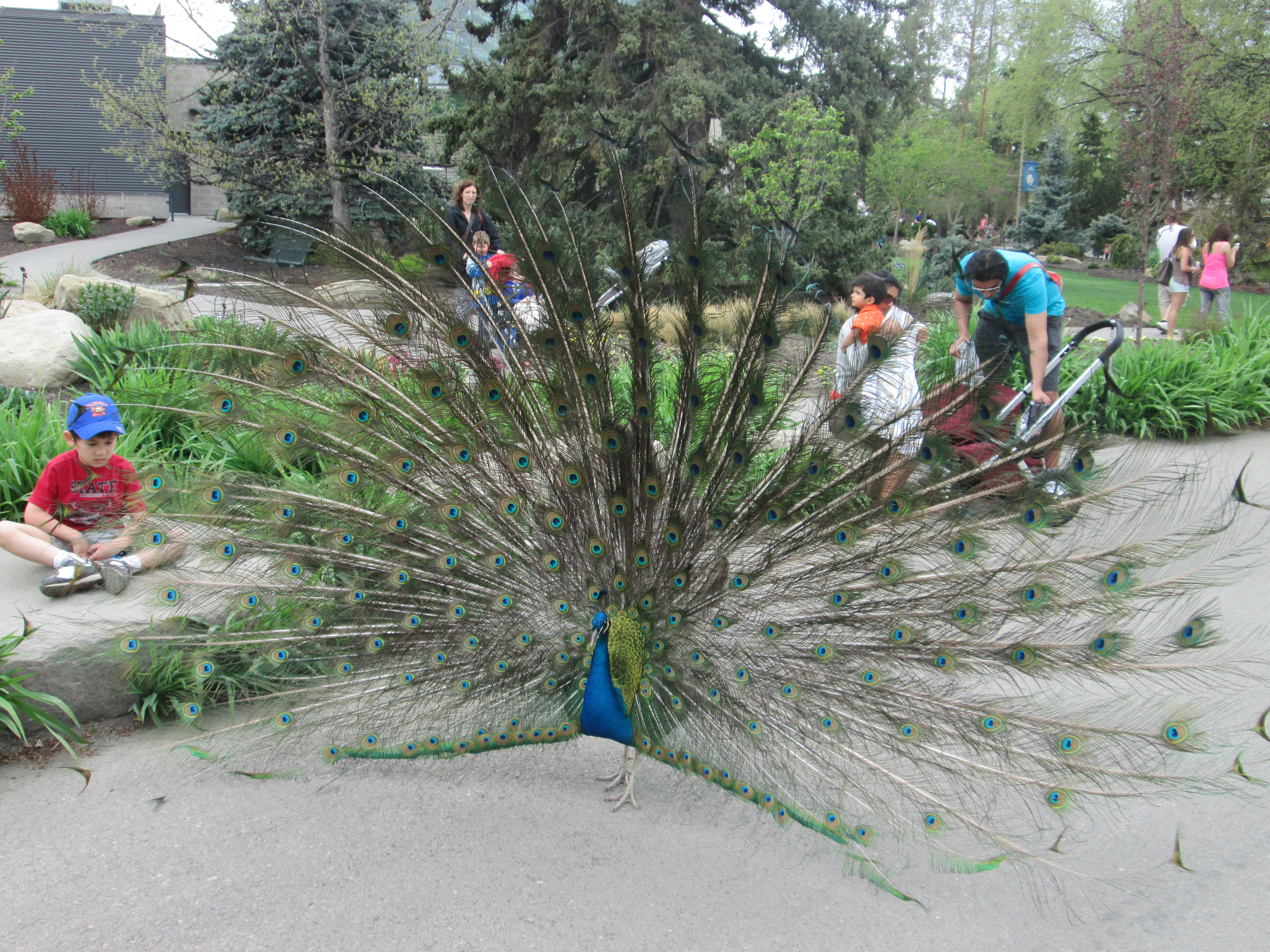
Peacock in public.

The zoo contains a flock of Chilean flamingos next to the enclosure containing both a herd of alpacas and greater rheas. Indian peafowl are allowed to venture around openly and freely across the zoo grounds, and are taken to an off-site facility for the winter months.

Prior to the 2013 flooding, the zoo also had an area section dedicated to South American animals such as giant anteaters, red-bellied piranhas and various New World monkeys, as well as a number of birds including several species of macaw and two Andean condors. There also used to be an Australian animal portion, notorious for the Creatures of the Night exhibit, mostly consisting of various nocturnal animals such as bats. Also present were a number of kangaroos, emus, monitor lizards, and for a brief temporary time, koalas.

Kamala the elephant lived at Calgary Zoo from 1976 to 2014. While there, she gave birth to a male named Calvin in 1986, a female named Maharani in 1990. Calvin, then called Chanda, was indefinitely loaned to Ontario's African Lion Safari in 1989 as part of a breeding program. Maharani had a calf in 2007, which died shortly after birth due to elephant endotheliotropic herpesvirus.

== Conservation ==
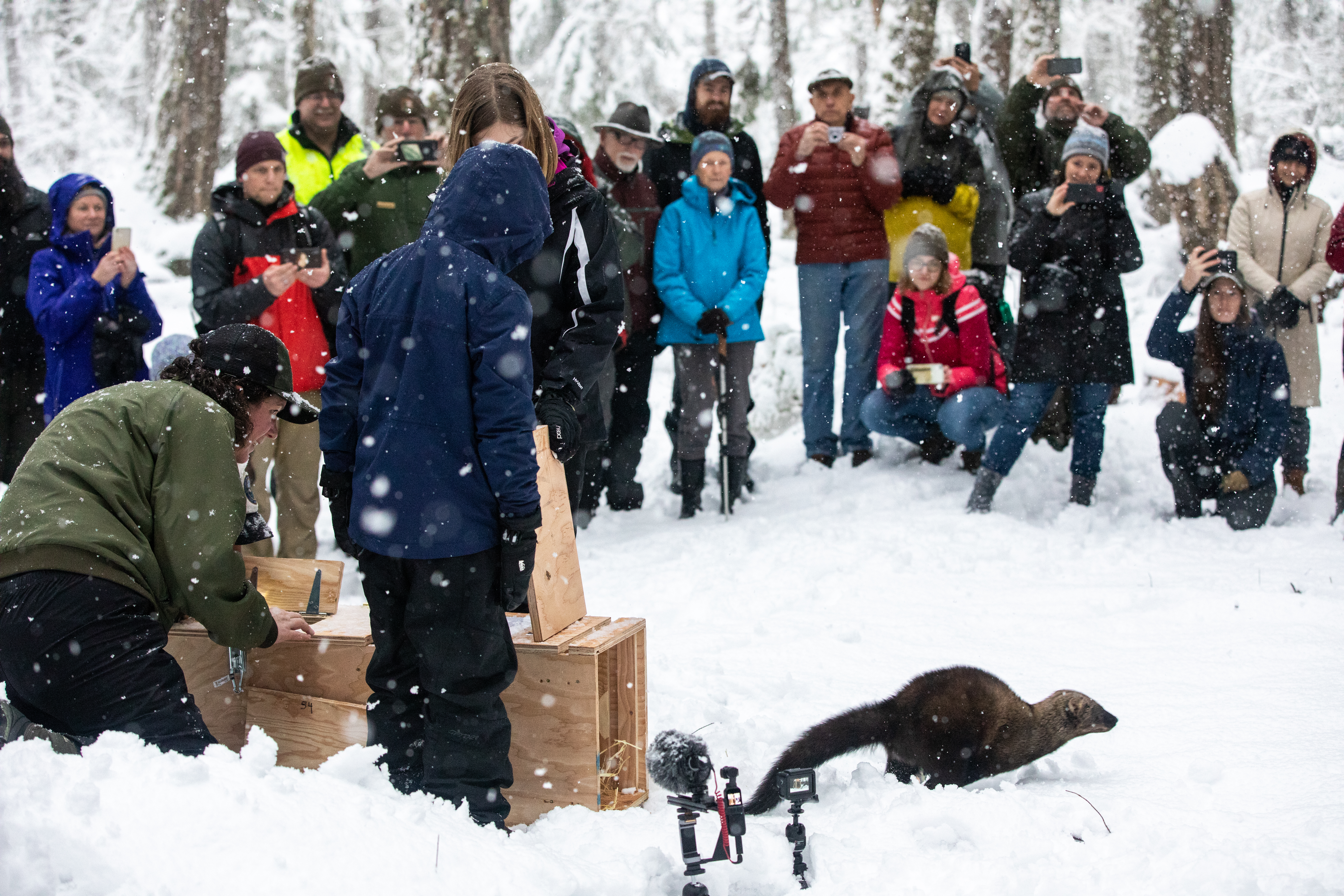
The zoo was a part of a multi-organization conservation effort that was involved in releasing fishers back into the Nisqually Tribal Use Area at Mount Rainier National Park.

44 species are cared for within Species Survival Plans, a global initiative to protect at-risk genetic diversity. Twenty-nine species at the zoo are in danger of extinction. Other species are considered "ambassadors" for endangered species. The Wilder Institute/Calgary Zoo uses a team of educators including animal care technicians, interpreters, teachers, and volunteers to increase awareness among visitors about the beauty of nature and threats to wildlife. Each year the zoo's formal programs connect directly with more than 575,000 adults and children.

The Wilder Institute's Calgary Zoo is home to a team of biologists who have earned international recognition as North America's leaders in the science of species recovery and reintroduction. The science journal Nature rates the Wilder Institute's Calgary Zoo as one of the top five zoos in the world for conservation research, alongside New York, San Diego, Frankfurt, and London. In June 2012, the head of the Calgary Zoo's Centre for Conservation Research, Dr. Axel Moehrenschlager, was awarded the Canadian Wildlife Federation's Roland Michener Conservation Award which recognizes individuals who have shown a commitment to "promote, enhance, and further the conservation of Canada's natural resources". Dr. Moehrenschlager is chair of the Reintroduction Specialist Group within the International Union for the Conservation of Nature, the world's largest conservation network. He is the first North American to hold this position.

The zoo focused on saving eight highly endangered Western Canada species: whooping crane, Vancouver Island marmot, swift fox, black-footed ferret, black-tailed prairie dog, burrowing owl, northern leopard frog and greater sage-grouse. It also works on conservation projects around the world, including:

- Wechiau Community Hippo Sanctuary, Ghana
- Snow leopards in Central Asia, and
- Gorillas in the Democratic Republic of the Congo

In 2008, the zoo's Wechiau Community Hippo Sanctuary project, a collaboration involving 17 Ghana villages, was awarded the United Nations Equator Prize as one of the world's top 25 conservation initiatives. It has become a model for community-based conservation throughout Africa.

== Notable animal births ==
In March 2012, Amur tiger Katja gave birth to three Amur tiger cubs at the zoo. The species is so highly endangered (there are an estimated 350 individuals worldwide), the births represented a 1% jump in the global population. In 2014, it became necessary to separate Vasili and Samkha, the two male tiger cubs, now almost full grown, from sister Kira and mom Katja (12 years old). Based on the Species Survival Plan recommendation, which manages genetics for future breeding, they were moved to Assiniboine Park Zoo in Winnipeg. In May 2018 Vasili was moved to Toronto Zoo in Toronto.

In early 2016, a western lowland gorilla infant was born to Kioja. Named Kimani, she was underweight at birth, but quickly recovered. Kimani died in 2022 after a struggle with cancer.

In August 2016 a king penguin chick named Edward hatched, born to mother Grace. The following year another king penguin chick hatched and was named Cleopatra to follow a theme of royal names.

In May 2017 a Przewalski's horse foal was born at the Calgary Zoo's Wildlife Conservation Centre. While not visible to the public, this is an important addition to the genetic diversity of the endangered wild horse.

In June 2018 a bactrian camel calf was born to Eva. He was later named Gobi.

== Events ==
=== Zoolights ===
Zoolights is a Christmas lights festival held annually at the Zoo. It usually closes around the end of December or the beginning of January. The month-long, animal-themed show features more than one million lights and is the largest seasonal light show in western Canada.

== Incidents ==
Following a series of high-profile incidents in 2008 and 2009, some commentators criticized the zoo's conduct and operations.

Past incidents cited included:

- In January 2009, a two-year-old male Markhor died after becoming entangled in an exhibit's play toy.
- In 2009, a knife was accidentally left in the western lowland gorilla enclosure.
- On 5 December 2009, an 18-month-old female capybara died after being crushed by a hydraulic door. A worker did not follow a long-standing procedure in operating the door.

The zoo's director said all the incidents are unrelated. An independent review was solicited by the zoo in December 2009 and was conducted by the Canadian Association of Zoos and Aquariums. The report, released in 2010, spotlighted systemic problems. In response, the zoo developed a 36-point plan that included improving animal care procedures and collection planning, addressing staffing issues like training and structure, enhancing security systems and safety drills, and upgrading aging zoo infrastructure. Later that year, the zoo hired noted animal welfare specialist, Dr. Jake Veasey, who has since instituted major changes and spearheaded new investment in animal facilities.

Additional incidents and animal deaths also include:

- In September 2010, Calgary Zoo staff announced the overnight death of a second tiger cub born earlier in the week to a Siberian tiger. Zookeepers were not aware that Katja, the 10-year-old mother, was expecting, saying it is hard to detect pregnancy in tigers. Katja did not nurse her young. Zoo staff noticed her carrying the first kitten in her mouth, which is likely how it died. The zoo's veterinary team says both Siberian tiger cubs suffered similar head trauma.
- In October 2011, a zookeeper resigns following the death of a corn snake, as the keeper had left it unattended near a heat source.
- In September 2014, a problem with an ozone sensor in the hippopotamus pool is blamed for the deaths of 85 tilapia.
- In February 2016, an otter drowned after becoming tangled in pants given to it by a zookeeper.
- In December 2016, seven Humboldt penguins died, drowning in a holding pool.
- In May 2023, a Masai Giraffe died of a broken neck after getting its ossicone caught in a cable around their enclosure.
- In July 2024, one of the zoo's popular polar bears, Baffin, died by drowning after what zoo officials described as "rough play" with another bear.
- On 12 November 2024, a two-year-old female gorilla died after being struck by a hydraulic door, after a worker mistakenly activated the wrong door while the gorilla was being separated for individual training.
