= List of WAZA member zoos and aquariums =

This is a list of zoos and aquariums that are members of World Association of Zoos and Aquariums (WAZA).

The WAZA has two types/levels of membership. The first is an association member that is through another zoo association such as the Association of Zoos and Aquariums (AZA). The second is a direct institutional membership of WAZA.

Name	Address	City, state/province	Country	Other associations
Aalborg Zoo	Mølleparkvej 63	Aalborg, Region Nordjylland	Denmark	EAZA, DAZA
Adelaide Zoo	Frome Road	Adelaide, South Australia	Australia	ARAZPA
African Lion Safari	1386 Cooper Road	Flamborough, Ontario	Canada	CAZA, IEF, IAATE
Akron Zoological Park	500 Edgewood Avenue	Akron, Ohio	United States	AZA
Al Ain Wildlife Park & Resort (AWPR)	P.O. BOX 1204	Al Ain, Abu Dhabi	United Arab Emirates	EAZA
Albuquerque Biological Park	903 10th St SW	Albuquerque, New Mexico	United States	AZA
Allwetterzoo Münster	Sentruper Str. 315	Münster, North-Rhine Westphalia	Germany	EAZA, VDZ
Alpenzoo Innsbruck	Weiherburggasse 37a	Innsbruck, Tyrol	Austria	EAZA
Apenheul Primate Park	PO Box 97	Apeldoorn, Gelderland	Netherlands	EAZA, NVD
Aquamarine Fukushima	50 Tatsumi-Cho	Onahama, Iwaki, Fukushima	Japan	JAZA
Aquarium of the Bay	The Embarcadero at Beach Street	San Francisco, California	United States	AZA
Aquário Marinho do Rio de Janeiro		Rio de Janeiro	Brazil	ALPZA, AZAB, SINDEPAT
Aquarium du Québec	1675 Avenue des Hôtels	Québec	Canada	
Aquazoo Düsseldorf	Kaiserswerther Str 380	Dusseldorf	Germany	
Artis Zoo	PO Box 20164	Amsterdam, North Holland	Netherlands	EAZA, NVD
Assiniboine Park Zoo		Manitoba	Canada	
Atlantis		Dubai	United Arab Emirates	
Auckland Zoo	Private Bag, Grey Lynn	Auckland, Auckland	New Zealand	ARAZPA
Audubon Zoo	PO Box 4327	New Orleans, Louisiana	United States	AZA
Belfast Zoo	Antrim Road	Belfast, County Antrim	Northern Ireland	EAZA, BIAZA
Bergen Aquarium			Norway	
Biodôme de Montréal			Canada	
Bioparc de Doué-la-Fontaine		Doué-la-Fontaine, Maine-et-Loire	France	EAZA, AFDPZ
BIOPARC Valencia			Spain	
Borås djurpark	PO Box 502	Borås, Västergötland, Västra Götaland County	Sweden	EAZA, SAZA
Bristol Zoo Project			United Kingdom	
Bronx Zoo	2300 Southern Blvd	New York City	United States	AZA
Brookfield Zoo	3300 Golf Rd	Brookfield, Illinois	United States	AZA, AMMPA
Budapest Zoo and Botanical Gardens			Hungary	
Busch Gardens Tampa Bay	PO Box 9158, Bougainvillea Avenue	Tampa, Florida	United States	PAAZAB, AZA
Caldwell Zoo	PO Box 4785	Tyler, Texas	United States	AZA
Cameron Park Zoo	1701 N 4th St	Waco, Texas	United States	AZA
Cango Wildlife Ranch	191 Baron van Rheede St	Oudtshoorn, Western Cape	South Africa	AZA, PAAZA
Chester Zoo	Caughall Road	Upton by Chester, Chester, Cheshire, North West England	England	EAZA, BIAZA
Cheyenne Mountain Zoo	4250 Cheyenne Mount Zoo Rd	Colorado Springs, Colorado	United States	AZA
Chiang Mai Zoo	100 Huaykaew Rd.	Suthep, Amphoe Mueang, Chiang Mai	Thailand	SEAZA
Chiba Zoological Park			Japan	
Chimelong Safari Park			China	
Cincinnati Zoo & Botanical Gardens	3400 Vine Street	Cincinnati, Ohio	United States	AZA
Cleveland Metroparks Zoo	3900 Wildlife Way	Cleveland, Ohio	United States	AZA
Colchester Zoo	Maldon Road, Stanway	Colchester, Essex, East of England	England	EAZA, BIAZA, AEECL
Cologne Zoo			Germany	
Columbus Zoo and Aquarium			United States	
Copenhagen Zoo	Roskildevej 38, PO Box 7	Frederiksberg, Region Hovedstaden	Denmark	EAZA, DAZA, VDZ
Dallas World Aquarium	1801 N Griffin Street	Dallas, Texas	United States	AZA
Dallas Zoo	650 S.R.L. Thornton Freeway	Dallas, Texas	United States	AZA
Dartmoor Zoological Society			United Kingdom	
Denver Zoo	City Park, 2300 Steele Street	Denver, Colorado	United States	AZA
Detroit Zoo	8450 W. 10 Mile Rd.	Royal Oak, Michigan	United States	AZA
Disney's Animal Kingdom	PO Box 10000, 660 N. Savannah Circle West	Bay Lake, Florida	United States	AZA
Dubai Safari Park			United Arab Emirates	
Dublin Zoo			Ireland	
Edinburgh Zoo	Murrayfield	Edinburgh	Scotland	EAZA, BIAZA, AEECL
Edmonton Valley Zoo			Canada	
Emirates Park Zoo and Resort			United Arab Emirates	
Everland Zoo	310 Jeondae-ri, Pokog-myum	Yongin, Kyonggi Province	South Korea	AZA
Flamingo Land Resort	Kirby Misperton	Malton, North Yorkshire	England	EAZA, BIAZA
Fondazione Bioparco di Roma			Italy	
Fort Wayne Zoo	3411 Sherman Blvd	Fort Wayne, Indiana	United States	AZA
Fort Worth Zoo	1989 Colonial Parkway	Fort Worth, Texas	United States	AZA
Fresno Chaffee Zoo	894 W Belmont Ave	Fresno, California	United States	AZA
Fundação Jardim Zoológico de Brasília			Brazil	
Fundación Temaikèn	Ruta Provincial 25 km. 0.700	Belén de Escobar, Buenos Aires	Argentina	AZA, ALPZA, AZARA
Fundación Zoológica de Cali			Colombia	
Gdański Ogród Zoologiczny			Poland	
Gembira Loka Zoo			Indonesia	
Georgia Aquarium	225 Baker Street, NW	Atlanta, Georgia	United States	AZA
Givskud Zoo	Løveparkvej 3	Givskud, Region of Southern Denmark	Denmark	EAZA, DAZA
Gladys Porter Zoo	500 East Ringgold Street	Brownsville, Texas	United States	AZA
Great Plains Zoo	805 S Kiwanis Avenue	Sioux Falls, South Dakota	United States	AZA
Greater Vancouver Zoo		British Columbia	Canada	
Guadeloupe Zoo			French West Indies	
Hai Park Kiryat Motzkin			Israel	
Haifa Educational Zoo			Israel	
Hamilton Zoo		Hamilton	New Zealand	
Haus des Meeres – Aqua Terra Zoo	Esterhazypark Fritz-Grünbaumplatz 1 A-1060	Wien, Wien	Austria	EAZA, VDZ, OZO
Helsinki Zoo	Mustikkamaanpolku 12, 00570 Helsinki, Finland	Helsinki, Uusimaa	Finland	EAZA, SAZA
Henry Vilas Zoo	702 South Randall Avenue	Madison, Wisconsin	United States	AZA
Hertfordshire Zoo			United Kingdom	
Highland Wildlife Park			United Kingdom	
Hobart Zoo and Aquarium			Australia	
Hong Kong Zoological and Botanical Gardens	11/F, LCSD HQs, 1–3 Pai Tau St	Shatin, Hong Kong	Hong Kong	SEAZA
Houston Zoo	6200 Hermann Park Drive	Houston, Texas	United States	AZA
Indianapolis Zoo	PO Box 22309	Indianapolis, Indiana	United States	AZA, AMMPA
International Crane Foundation			United States	
Istanbul Aquarium	Yeşilköy Halkalı Cad. No: 93	Bakırköy, Istanbul	Turkey	
Jacksonville Zoological Gardens	370 Zoo Parkway	Jacksonville, Florida	United States	AZA
Jardim Zoológico de Lisboa	Estrada de Benfica, 158/160	Lisboa, Grande Lisboa	Portugal	EAZA, AIZA, AMMPA
Jimmy's Farm & Wildlife Park			United Kingdom	
Johannesburg Zoological Gardens	Private Bag X13/Parkview	Johannesburg, Gauteng	South Africa	PAAZAB
John G. Shedd Aquarium		Chicago, Illinois	United States	
Kansas City Zoo	6700 Zoo Drive	Kansas City, Missouri	United States	AZA
Khao Kheow Open Zoo	235 Moo 7 | Bang Phra subdistrict, Si Racha	Chonburi	Thailand	SEAZA, ZPO
Khon Kaen Zoo			Thailand	
Knuthenborg Park and Safari	Birketvej 1, 4941 Bandholm	Lolland, Region Zealand	Denmark	EAZA, DAZA
Kolmården Wildlife Park	S-61892 Kolmården	Kolmården, Norrköping Municipality, Östergötland, Östergötland County	Sweden	EAZA, SAZA
Kraków Zoo	ul. Kasy Oszczednosci Miasta Krakowa 14	Kraków, Lesser Poland Voivodeship	Poland	EAZA
Liberec Zoo	Masarykova 1347/31	Liberec, Liberec Region	Czech Republic	EAZA, UCSZOO, IZE, ISIS
Lincoln Park Zoo in Lincoln Park	2001 N Clark Street	Chicago, Illinois	United States	AZA
Loro Parque S.A.	Avenida Loro Parque s/n	Puerto de la Cruz – Tenerife, Santa Cruz de Tenerife, Islas Canarias	Spain	EAZA, AIZA
Los Angeles Zoo and Botanical Gardens	5333 Zoo Drive	Los Angeles, California	United States	AZA
Lowry Park Zoo	1101 W Sligh Avenue	Tampa, Florida	United States	AZA
Mandai Wildlife Group		Singapore	Singapore	SEAZA
Marwell Wildlife		Colden Common, Winchester, Hants, South East England	England	EAZA, BIAZA
Melbourne Aquarium	Corner of King & Flinders St	Melbourne	Australia	ARAZPA, SEAZA
Memphis Zoo and Aquarium	2000 Prentiss Place	Memphis, Tennessee	United States	AZA
Miejski Ogród Zoologiczny w Warszawie	ul. Ratuszowa 1/3	Warszawa, Masovian Voivodeship	Poland	EAZA, RDPOZiA
Milwaukee County Zoological Gardens	10001 W Bluemound Road	Milwaukee, Wisconsin	United States	AZA
Minnesota Zoo	13000 Zoo Blvd	Apple Valley, Minnesota	United States	AZA, AMMPA
Московский зоопарк (Moscow Zoo)	Bolshaya Gruzinskaya 1	Moscow, Moscow Oblast, Central Federal District	Russia	EAZA, EARAZA
Münchener Tierpark Hellabrunn GmbH	Tierparkstrasse 30	München, Bavaria	Germany	EAZA, VDZ
Nagoya Higashiyama Zoo	3–70 Higashiyama-Motomachi	Chikusa-ku, Nagoya, Aichi	Japan	JAZA
Nandankanan Zoological Park	Mayur Bhawan	Saheed Nagar, Bhubaneswar, Orissa	India	SAZARC, CZA
National Museum of Marine Biology and Aquarium	2 Houwan Road	Checheng, Pingtung County	Taiwan	
National Zoological Gardens of South Africa	PO Box 754, Boom Street 232	Pretoria, Gauteng	South Africa	PAAZAB
National Zoo of Malaysia (Zoo Negara)	Hulu Kelang, Selangor Darul Ehsan 68000	Ampang, Selangor Darul Ehsan	Malaysia	SEAZA
National Zoological Park	3001 Connecticut Avenue NW	Washington, D.C.	United States	AZA
New York Aquarium	Surf Avenue at West 8th Street	Brooklyn, New York	United States	AZA, AMMPA
Nordens Ark	Åby Säteri	Hunnebostrand, Bohuslän, Västra Götaland County	Sweden	EAZA, SAZA
North Carolina Zoo	4401 Zoo Pkwy	Asheboro, North Carolina	United States	AZA
Новосиби́рский зоопарк (Novosibirsk Zoo)	Municipal Unitary Enterprise 71/1 Timiryazeva Str.	Novosibirsk, Novosibirsk Oblast, Siberian Federal District	Russia	EAZA (Candidate for Membership), EARAZA
Nyíregyházi Állatpark	4431 Sóstófürdő	Nyíregyháza, Szabolcs-Szatmár-Bereg, Northern Great Plain	Hungary	EAZA, MAS
Oceanário de Lisboa	Esplanada D. Carlos 1	Lisboa, Grande Lisboa	Portugal	EAZA, AIZA
Ocean Park Hong Kong	Ocean Park Road	Aberdeen, Hong Kong	Hong Kong	SEAZA, AZA, AMMPA
Odense Zoo	Sdr. Boulevard 306	Odense, Region of Southern Denmark	Denmark	EAZA, DAZA
Ogród Zoologiczny w Opolu	ul. Spacerowa 10, Skr. poczt. 5	Opole, Opole Voivodeship	Poland	EAZA, RDPOZiA
Oklahoma City Zoological Park	2101 NE 50th St	Oklahoma City, Oklahoma	United States	AZA
Olomouc Zoo	Darwinova 29	Olomouc, Olomouc Region	Czech Republic	EAZA, UCSZOO, EARAZA, IZE, ISIS
Omaha's Henry Doorly Zoo	3701 S 10th St	Omaha, Nebraska	United States	AZA
Orana Wildlife Trust	McLeans Island Road / Box 5130	Papanui, Christchurch, Canterbury	New Zealand	ARAZPA
Oregon Zoo	4001 SW Canyon Road	Portland, Oregon	United States	AZA
Ostrava Zoo	Michálkovická 197	Ostrava, Moravian-Silesian Region	Czech Republic	EAZA, UCSZOO, IZE, ISIS, AEECL, UCBZ
Padmaja Naidu Himalayan Zoological Park	Jawahar Parbat	Darjeeling, West Bengal	India	SAZARC, CZA
Paignton Zoo Environmental Park	Totnes Road	Paignton, Devon, South West England	England	EAZA, BIAZA
Paradise Wildlife Park	White Stubbs Lane	Broxbourne, Herts, East of England	England	EAZA, BIAZA
Parc Zoologique de Paris	Bois de Vincennes 53, Avenue St-Maurice	Paris, Paris Île-de-France	France	EAZA, SNDPZ, ANPZ, AEECL
Parc Zoologique de Thoiry	Rue du Pavilon de Montreuil	Thoiry, Yvelines, Île-de-France	France	EAZA, ANPZ, CEPA,
Parque Zoológico de Barcelona	Parc de la Ciutadella, s/n	Ciutat Vella – Barcelona, Barcelona, Catalonia	Spain	EAZA, AIZA
Palm Beach Zoo at Dreher Park	1301 Summit Blvd	West Palm Beach, Florida	United States	AZA
Perth Zoo	PO Box 489, Labouchere Rd.	South Perth, Perth, Western Australia	Australia	ARAZPA
Philadelphia Zoo	3400 W Girard Avenue	Philadelphia, Pennsylvania	United States	AZA
Phoenix Zoo	455 N Galvin Pkwy	Phoenix, Arizona	United States	AZA
Point Defiance Zoo & Aquarium	5400 N Pearl St	Tacoma, Washington	United States	AZA, AMMPA
Poznań Zoo	ul. Zwierzyniecka 19	Poznań, Greater Poland Voivodeship	Poland	EAZA
Prague Zoo	U Trojského Zámku 3/120	Prague-Troja, Central Bohemian Region	Czech Republic	EAZA, UCSZOO, EARAZA, IZE, ISIS, ITG
Racine Zoological Gardens	200 Goold Street	Racine, Wisconsin	United States	AZA
Ragunan Zoo	Jln. Harsono Rm. No. 1	Ragunan, Pasar Minggu, Jakarta	Indonesia	
Ripley's Aquarium of Canada	288 Bremner Blvd	Toronto	Canada	AZA
Riverbanks Zoo	PO Box 1060	Columbia, South Carolina	United States	AZA
Sacramento Zoo	3930 W Land Park Drive	Sacramento, California	United States	AZA
Saint Louis Zoo	1 Government Drive	Saint Louis, Missouri	United States	AZA
San Antonio Zoological Gardens & Aquarium	3903 N. Saint Mary's Street	San Antonio, Texas	United States	AZA
San Diego Zoo	PO Box 120551	San Diego, California	United States	AZA
San Francisco Zoo	1 Zoo Road	San Francisco, California	United States	AZA
Santa Barbara Zoological Gardens	500 Ninos Drive	Santa Barbara, California	United States	AZA
SeaWorld Orlando	7007 SeaWorld Drive	Orlando, Florida	United States	AZA, AMMPA
Sedgwick County Zoo	5555 W Zoo Blvd	Wichita, Kansas	United States	AZA
Seoul Grand Park Zoo	PO Box 427-080 159-1 Maggyedong	Gwacheon, Gyeonggi-do Province	Korea	SEAZA, AZA
Shanghai Zoo	Hongqiao Road No. 2381	Shanghai, Shanghai	China	CAZG
Skansen-Akvariet	Box 27807	Stockholm stad, Uppland, Stockholm County	Sweden	EAZA, SAZA
Sydney Aquarium & Sydney Wildlife World	Aquarium Pier, Darling Harbour	Sydney, New South Wales	Australia	ARAZPA
Taipei Zoo	30 Hsin-Kuang Road, Sec. 2	Taipei City	Taiwan	SEAZA
Tallinn Zoological Gardens – Tallinna Loomaaed	Paldiski Road 145	Tallinn, Harju maakond	Estonia	EAZA, VDZ, EARAZA
Tama Zoo	7-1-1 Hodokubo, Hino-Shi	Hino-shi, Tokyo	Japan	JAZA
Taronga Zoo	PO Box 20	Mosman, Sydney, New South Wales	Australia	ARAZPA
Tennōji Zoo	6–74 Chausuyama-cho	Tennōji-ku, Osaka, Osaka	Japan	SEAZA, JAZA
Tiergarten der Stadt Nürnberg	Am Tiergarten 30	Nürnberg, Bavaria	Germany	EAZA, VDZ
Tiergarten Schönbrunn	Maxingstrasse 13b A-1130	Wien, Wien	Austria	EAZA, VDZ, OZO
Tierpark Dählhölzli	Tierparkweg 1, CH-3005	Bern, Bern	Switzerland	EAZA, VDZ
The Living Desert Zoo and Gardens	47–900 Portola Avenue	Palm Desert, California	United States	AZA
The Tisch Family Zoological Gardens – The Biblical Zoo	PO Box 898	Jerusalem, Jerusalem	Israel	EAZA
Toledo Zoological Gardens	PO Box 140130	Toledo, Ohio	United States	AZA
Topeka Zoo	635 SW Gage Blvd	Topeka, Kansas	United States	AZA
Toronto Zoo	361A Old Finch Avenue	Toronto, Ontario	Canada	AZA, CAZA
Tulsa Zoo	6421 E 36th St. N	Tulsa, Oklahoma	United States	AZA
Two Oceans Aquarium	Dock Rd, V&A Waterfront, Cape Town	Cape Town, Western Cape	South Africa	PAAZAB
Ueno Zoo	9–83 Ueno Park	Taito-ku, Tokyo	Japan	JAZA
Umgeni River Bird Park	Montecasino Boulevard, Corner William Nicol Drive & Witkoppen Road, Fourways P.O. Box 1606	Bromhof, KwaZulu-Natal	South Africa	PAAZAB
UnderWater World Sunshine Coast	Parkyn Parade PO Box 511	Moonlaba, Sunshine Coast, Queensland	Australia	ARAZPA
Universeum	Södra v. 50 40020	Gothenburg, Västergötland, Västra Götaland County	Sweden	SAZA
uShaka Sea World	PO Box 10712, Marine Parade	Durban, KwaZulu-Natal	South Africa	PAAZAB
Ústí nad Labem Zoo	Drážd’anská 23	Ústí nad Labem, Ústí nad Labem Region	Czech Republic	EAZA, UCSZOO, EARAZA, IZE, ISIS
Utah's Hogle Zoo	2600 Sunnyside Avenue	Salt Lake City, Utah	United States	AZA
Vancouver Aquarium	845 Avison Way in Stanley Park	Vancouver, British Columbia	Canada	AZA, CAZA
Wellington Zoo	200 Daniell Street, Newtown	Wellington, Greater Wellington	New Zealand	ARAZPA
Welsh Mountain Zoo		Colwyn Bay, Conwy, North Wales	Wales	EAZA, BIAZA
Weltvogelpark Walsrode	Am Vogelpark, 29664	Walsrode, Lower Saxony	Germany	EAZA, VDZ
Wilhelma Zoologisch-Botanischer Garten	Wilhelma 13	Stuttgart, Baden-Württemberg	Germany	EAZA, VDZ
Woodland Park Zoo	601 No. 59th St	Seattle, Washington	United States	AZA
Wrocław Zoo	ul. Wróblewskiego 1–5	Wrocław, Lower Silesian Voivodeship	Poland	EAZA
Zoo Aquarium de Madrid	c/o PARQUES REUNIDOS, S.A., Casa de Campo, s/n	Moncloa-Aravaca – Madrid, Madrid	Spain	EAZA, AIZA
Zoo Atlanta	800 Cherokee Avenue SE	Atlanta, Georgia	United States	AZA
Zoo de Granby	525 rue St-Hubert	Granby, Quebec	Canada	AZA, CAZA
Palmyre Zoo	6 Ancien chemin de Royan	Les Mathes, Charente-Maritime, Poitou-Charentes	France	EAZA, ANPZ, WAPCA, CEPA, AEECL
Dresden Zoo	Tiergartenstrasse 1	Dresden, Saxony	Germany	EAZA, VDZ
Duisburg Zoo	Mülheimer Strasse 273	Duisburg, North Rhine-Westphalia	Germany	EAZA, VDZ
Hanover Zoo	Adenauerallee 3	Hannover, Lower Saxony	Germany	EAZA, VDZ
Zoo Landau	Hindenburgstrasse 12–14	Landau in der Pfalz, Rhineland-Palatinate	Germany	EAZA, VDZ
Ljubljana Zoo	Večna Pot 70	Rožnik, Ljubljana, Central region	Slovenia	EAZA
Zoo Miami	12400 SW 152nd St / One Zoo Boulevard	Miami, Florida	United States	AZA
Antwerp Zoo	Konigin Astridplein 26 B-2018	Antwerp, Antwerp	Belgium	EAZA
Zoo Zürich	Zürichbergstrasse 221 8044	Zürich, Zürich	Switzerland	EAZA, VDZ, zooschweiz
Zoological Center of Tel Aviv-Ramat Gan	POB 984	Ramat Gan, Tel Aviv	Israel	EAZA
Zoological Society of Ireland – Dublin Zoo	Phoenix Park	Dublin, County Dublin	Ireland	EAZA, BIAZA, WAPCA
Zoologická Záhrada Bojnice	Okr. Prievidza	Bojnice, okres Prievidza, Trenčiansky kraj	Slovakia	EAZA, UCSZOO, ASZG, ISIS, WAPCA
Zoologico de Chapultepec	Calle Chivatito s/n, San Miguel Chapultepec	Ciudad de Mexico, Disrito Federal	Mexico	AZCARM
Zoologico de São Paulo	Av. Miguel Stéfano 4241 – Água Funda	São Paulo, São Paulo	Brazil	SZB
Zoologico Guadalajara	Paseo del Zoologico 600	Guadalajara, Jalisco	Mexico	AZCARM
Zoologischer Garten Basel	Postfach	Basel, Basel-Stadt	Switzerland	EAZA, VDZ, zooschweiz
Zoologischer Garten Berlin	Hardenbergplatz 8	Berlin	Germany	EAZA, VDZ
Zoologischer Garten Frankfurt	Bernhard-Grzimek-Allee 1	Frankfurt, Hesse	Germany	EAZA, VDZ
Zoologischer Garten Karlsruhe	Ettlinger Strasse 6	Karlsruhe, Baden-Württemberg	Germany	EAZA, VDZ
Zoologischer Garten Köln	Riehler Strasse 173	Köln, North Rhine-Westphalia	Germany	EAZA, VDZ
Zoologischer Garten Leipzig	Pfaffendorfer-Strasse 29	Leipzig, Saxony	Germany	EAZA, VDZ
Zoologischer Garten Wuppertal	Hubertusallee 30	Wuppertal, North Rhine-Westphalia	Germany	EAZA, VDZ
ZOOM Erlebniswelt Gelsenkirchen	Bleckstraße 64, 45889	Gelsenkirchen, North-Rhine Westphalia	Germany	EAZA, VDZ
ZooParc de Beauval	41110 St. Aignan sur cher	St. Aignan, Loir-et-Cher, Centre-Val de Loire	France	EAZA, ANPZ, CEPA
Zoološki vrt grada Zagreba	Maksimirski Perivoj bb HR-10000	Zagreba, Zagrebačka županija	Croatia	EAZA
ZSL London Zoo	Regent's Park	London, Greater London	England	EAZA, BIAZA, WAPCA
Zoo Hluboká	Ohrada 417	Hluboká nad Vltavou, South Bohemian Region	Czech Republic	EAZA, UCSZOO, EARAZA, IZE, ISIS
Zoopark Chomutov	Přemyslova 259	Chomutov, Ústí nad Labem Region	Czech Republic	EAZA, UCSZOO, EARAZA
Zlín-Lešná Zoo	Lukovská 112	Zlín, Zlín Region	Czech Republic	EAZA, UCSZOO, SAZA, IZE, ISIS, UBZCR
ZSL Whipsnade Zoo	Dunstable	Whipsnade, Bedfordshire	England	EAZA, BIAZA
Osnabrück Zoo	Klaus-Strick-Weg 12	Osnabrück, Niedersachsen	Germany	EAZA, VDZ

== See also ==
- List of zoo associations
