= List of CAZA member zoos and aquariums =

This is a list of zoos and aquariums that are current members of Canada's Accredited Zoos and Aquariums.

== Members ==
Name	Address	City	Province
African Lion Safari & Game Farm	1386 Cooper Road	Flamborough	Ontario
Aquarium du Québec	1675 avenue des Hôtels	Sainte-Foy	Quebec
Assiniboine Park Zoo	2355 Corydon Avenue	Winnipeg	Manitoba
Biodôme de Montreal	4777 Pierre-de-Coubertin	Montreal	Quebec
Bird Kingdom	5651 River Road	Niagara Falls	Ontario
British Columbia Wildlife Park	9077 Dallas Drive	Kamloops	British Columbia
Cochrane Polar Bear Habitat	1 Drury Park Road	Cochrane	Ontario
Ecomuseum	21125 Chemin Ste-Marie	Sainte-Anne-de-Bellevue	Quebec
Edmonton Valley Zoo	13315 Buena Vista Road	Edmonton	Alberta
Greater Vancouver Zoo	5048 – 264th Street	Aldergrove	British Columbia
Little Ray's Nature Centre (Note: Closed since June 2025.)	869 Barton St. East	Hamilton	Ontario
Magnetic Hill Zoo	100 Worthington Avenue	Moncton	New Brunswick
Marine Life at Sea Life Caverns in West Edmonton Mall	#2472 8882-170 Street	Edmonton	Alberta
Parc Omega	399 Rte. 323	Montebello	Quebec
Parc Safari	850 Rte. 202	Hemmingford	Quebec
Ripley's Aquarium	288 Bremner Boulevard	Toronto	Ontario
Riverview Park & Zoo	1230 Water Street	Peterborough	Ontario
Safari Niagara	2821 Stevensville Road	Stevensville	Ontario
Saskatoon Forestry Farm Park and Zoo	1903 Forest Drive	Saskatoon	Saskatchewan
Science North	100 Ramsey Lake Road	Greater Sudbury	Ontario
Vancouver Aquarium	845 Avison Way in Stanley Park	Vancouver	British Columbia
Yukon Wildlife Preserve	Hot Springs Road	Whitehorse	Yukon
Zoo Sauvage de St-Félicien	2230 boul. du Jardin	St-Félicien	Quebec

== Former members ==
- Bowmanville Zoo – Bowmanville, Ontario – closed on 10 October 2016
- Calgary Zoo – AZA member
- Cherry Brook Zoo – Saint John, New Brunswick – closed in 2020
- Crystal Gardens Conservation Centre – Victoria, Brihatish Columbia – closed on 2 September 2004
- Granby Zoo – AZA member
- Jardin Zoologique du Quebec – Quebec City, Quebec – closed on 31 March 2006
- Little Ray's Nature Centre – Ottawa, Ontario – closed during the COVID-19 pandemic, has not reopened to the public since
- Marineland of Canada – Niagara Falls, Ontario – withdrew from membership in May 2017
- Mountain View Conservation & Breeding Society – Langley, British Columbia – had its membership revoked by CAZA due to claims of animal abuse
- Toronto Zoo – AZA member

== Affiliated ==
- Hagen Avicultural Research Institute – Rigaud, Quebec

== Commercial members ==
- Cinemuse Network – Gatineau, Quebec
- International Seafood and Bait Ltd. – Shippagan, New Brunswick
- Interzoo – Laval, Quebec
- Kingfisher Conservation Biology Laboratory – Whitchurch-Stouffville, Ontario
- Rare Import/Export Incorporated – Saint-Roch-de-l'Achigan, Quebec, Quebec
- Sunshine Polishing International – Saint-Hubert, Quebec
