= IZE =

IZE may refer to:

- International Zoo Educators Association
- IZE, an MS-DOS text-based management system
