= Budapest Zoo and Botanical Garden =

Zoo in Budapest, Hungary

Budapest Zoo & Botanical Garden
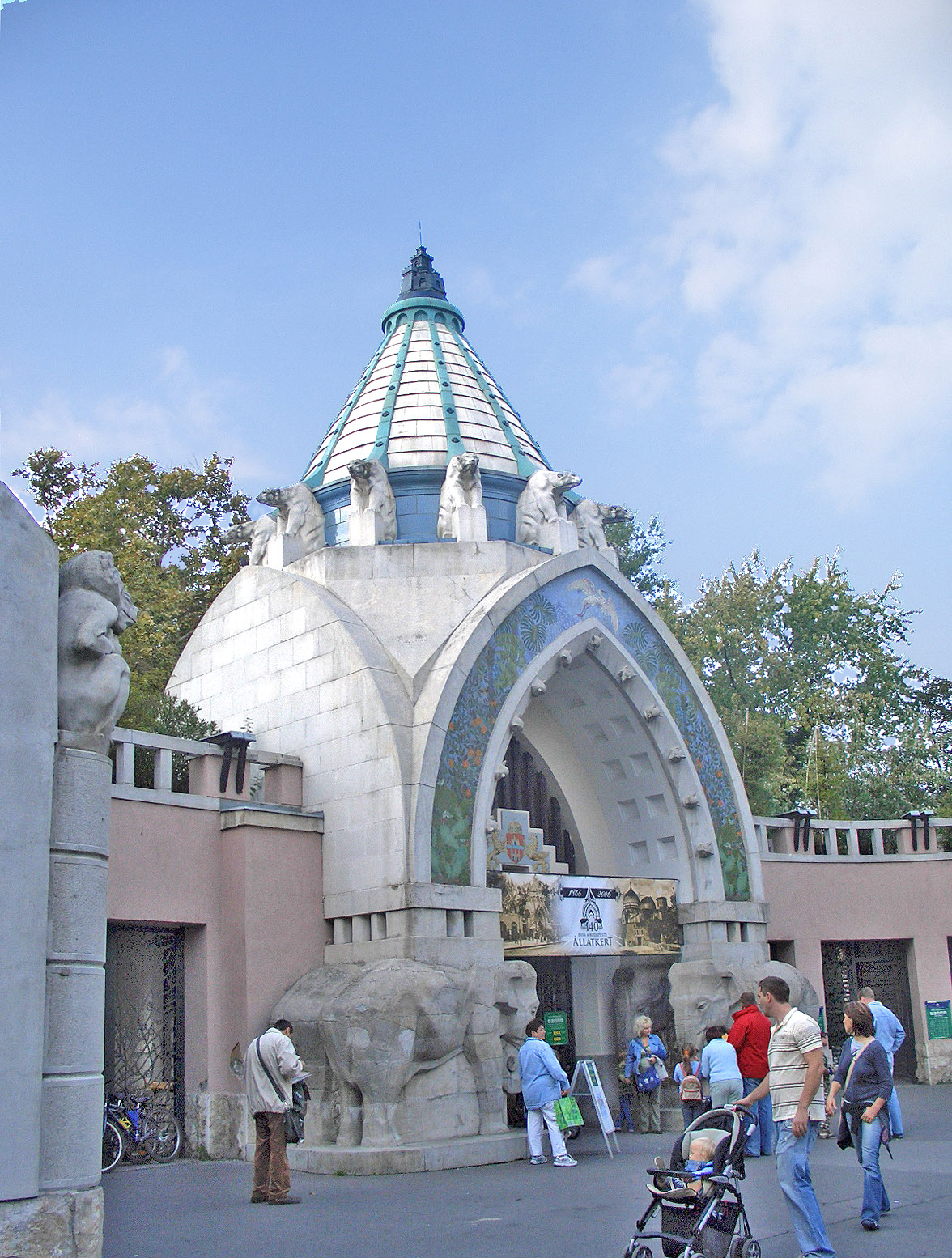
- The main entrance of Budapest Zoo
- Interactive map of Budapest Zoo & Botanical Garden
- 47°31′4.88″N 19°04′39.02″E
- Slogan: Zoo in the heart of Budapest
- Date opened: 9 August 1866; 159 years ago
- Location: Budapest, Hungary
- Land area: 18.4 hectares (45 acres)
- No. of animals: 10,354 (plus 117 populations with unknown numbers)
- No. of species: 1,072
- Annual visitors: 1–1.1 million
- Memberships: WAZA, EAZA, IZE, MME, BGCI
- Director: Roland Szabó
- Public transit: Budapest Trolleybus Network: 72 at Állatkert
- Website: www.zoobudapest.com/en

The Budapest Zoo & Botanical Garden (Hungarian: Fővárosi Állat- és Növénykert, lit. 'Metropolitan Zoo and Botanical Garden') is the oldest zoo in Hungary and one of the oldest in the world.

It has 1,072 animal species and is located within the City Park of Budapest, in the centre of the city, unusual for a zoo.

The zoo opened on 9 August 1866. The park has 1–1.1 million visitors every year. The area is a nature reserve, and has some valuable Art Nouveau buildings designed by Kornél Neuschloss and Károly Kós. The most special animals that are present in the zoo are the Komodo dragon and since December 2011 the wombat.

The zoo is located in the city centre and can be reached by Line 1 of the Budapest Metro.

Official city card (Budapest Card) owners get a 25% discount for a single ticket into the zoo.

== History ==
The Budapest Zoo and Botanical Garden is one of the oldest in the world. The idea of the foundation dates back to 1820-30s but it opened only on 9 August 1866. It was an initiative of a group of patriots among others geologist József Szabó, Ágoston Kubinyi, the Director of the National Museum, József Gerenday, the Director of the Botanical Garden of Budapest, and János Xántus, a zoologist, ethnographer, and the first director of the zoo.

At that time, the zoo displayed mainly Hungarian species and some rare species of monkeys, parrots, camels, and kangaroos, among others. Franz Joseph and Queen Elizabeth donated a giraffe and other animals to the zoo. The first lion house opened in 1876 with lions and tigers. An elephant, a hippopotamus, and a rhinoceros joined later on.

However, the initial enthusiasm waned and popularity of the zoo decreased. The new animals were expensive and the expenses of the company founded by the patriots exceeded the revenues. The management hired entertainers and comedians and the corporation was transformed into an animal and plant naturalizing company.

In 1873, Károly Serák was appointed zoo director. He directed for more than 30 years and he managed to maintain the zoo. He hired several artists, such as fire eaters, sword swallowers, and tightrope dancers in order to attract people. The revenues increased and the zoo was able to buy several special or rare animals, such as a hippopotamus and a Sumatran rhinoceros. The zoo housed about 2,000 species. However, as the authorities increased the rental fee and the financial situation of the zoo deteriorated. The company went bankrupt after the Millennium in 1896.

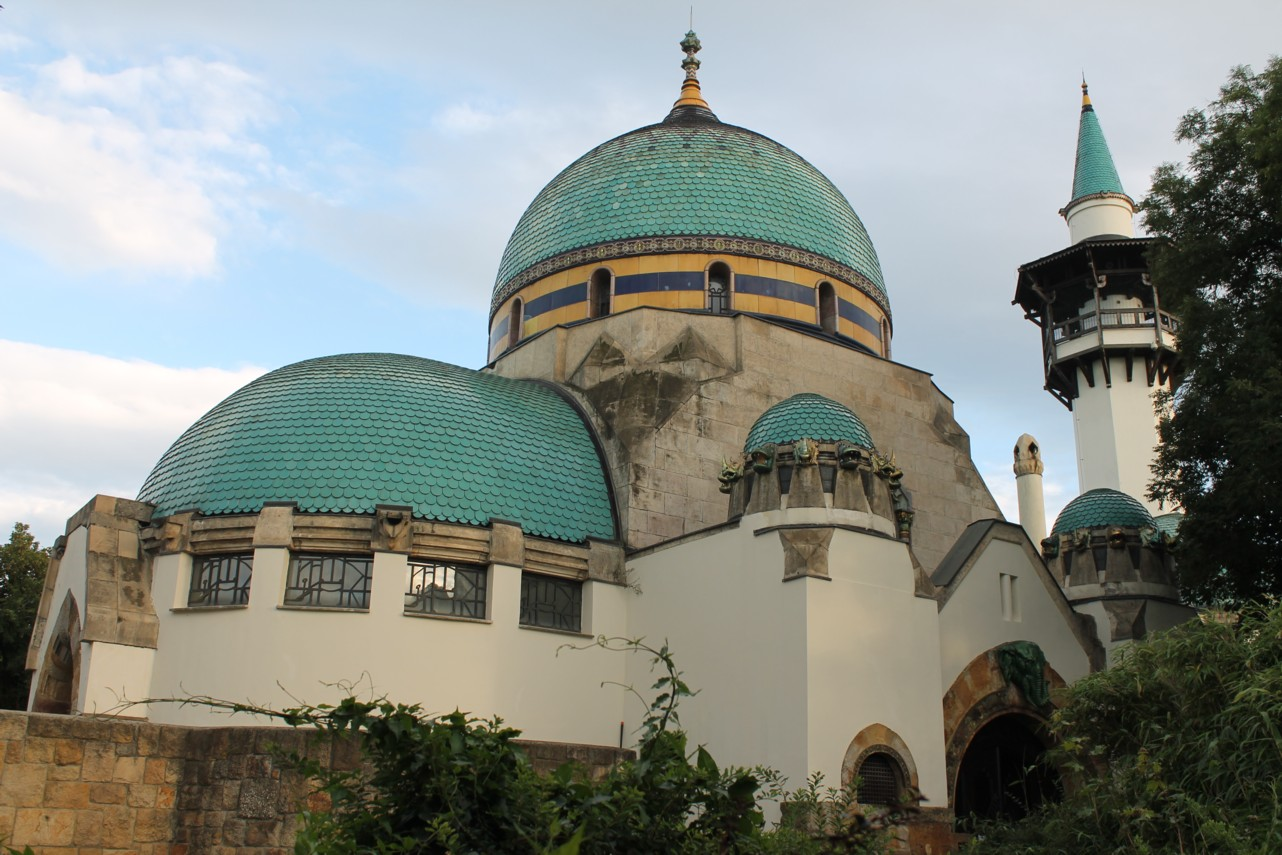
Elephant House, Budapest Zoo

In 1907, the zoo was auctioned and taken over by the capital city, Budapest. Supported by the mayor of Budapest, István Bárczy and his city developing program, a complete reconstruction took place between 1909 and 1912. The zoo was re-opened on 20 May 1912. The entertainers were separated from the zoo and a botanical garden was created. The historic buildings of the zoo are mainly from this time too. Adolf Lendl, a zoologist, was appointed director of the zoo. The institution was one of the most modern zoos in Europe.

The development was interrupted by the First World War. The zoo was almost entirely destroyed in the Second World War. During the siege of Budapest, the zoo was bombed and most buildings and animals were destroyed. After the siege, the remaining animals were eaten by the starving people of Budapest. Out of 2,000 specimens only 15 survived.

In 1945, the zoo re-opened with a few dozen animals. The damage was restored slowly. In the 1950s and 1960s, there was a major modernization. Between 1956 and 1967, the Director General of the zoo was Dr. Csaba Anghi. Under his guidance, the zoo became once again one of the most modern zoos of Europe.

In 1994, Miklós Persányi was appointed Director General. The historic buildings were reconstructed. The animal habitats have been modernized, enlarged, and made to look more natural.

In 2007, the first rhinoceros ever to be born with artificial insemination was born in the zoo.

In 2012, the General Assembly of Budapest has decided, that the zoo will take over part of the Amusement Park's territory and introduce Pony Park, a family game park and zoo.

On 14 February 2013, the zoo welcomed its first elephant calf since 1961.

In 2013, the zoo acquired most of the Amusement Park's territory and used it to create a children's area.

== Exhibits ==
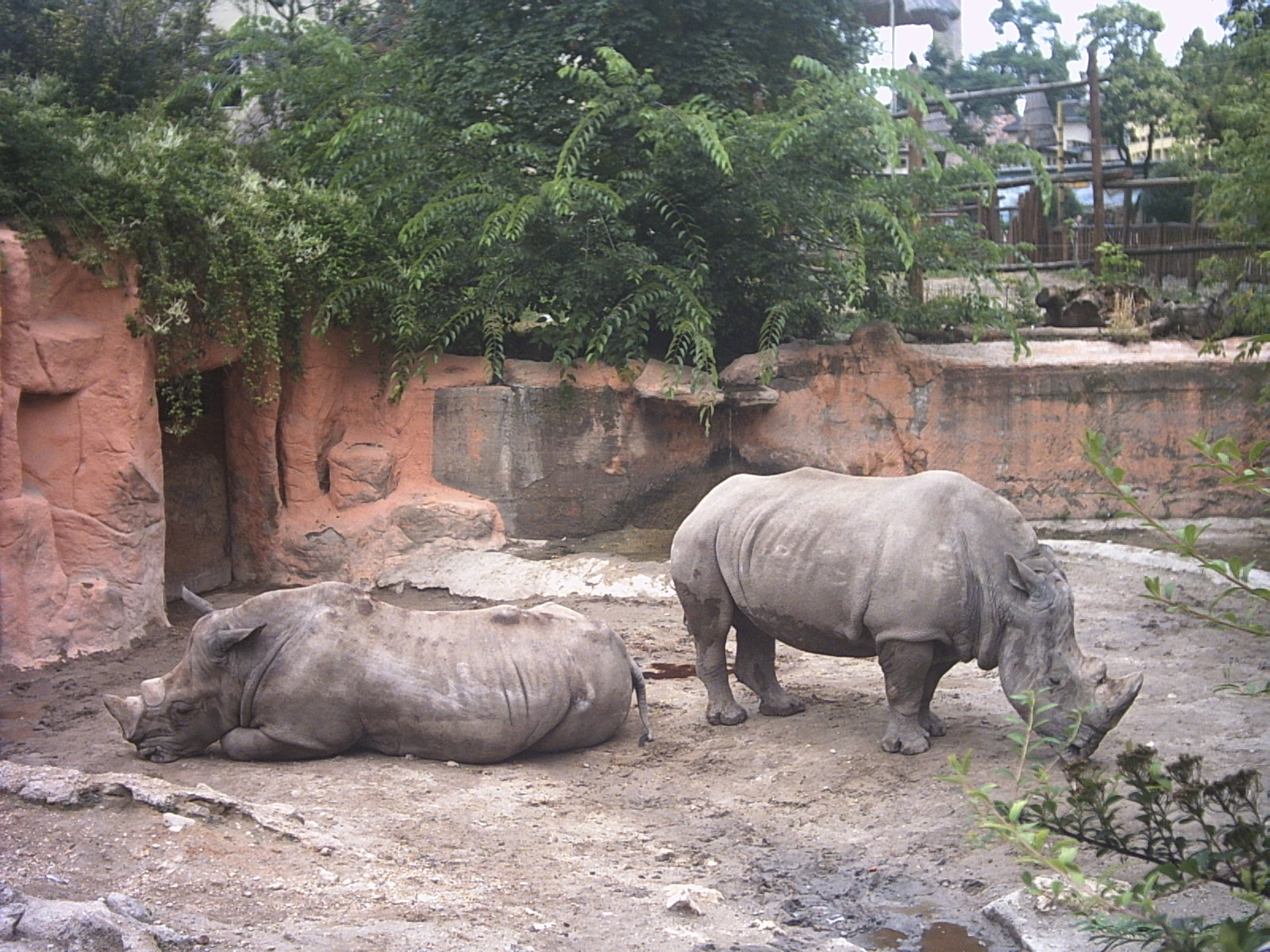
White rhinos at Budapest Zoo

The Magical Hill

The newest attraction of the zoo is The Magical Hill, found in the Great Rock. It presents the diversity of flora and fauna, the evolving of the diversity and the relationship between humankind and nature. It features more than 100 species, interactive games, and illustrative models.

America Tropicana

America Tropicana is the new name of the Palm-house. It presents the flora and fauna of the tropical climate American continent.

Savannah Zone

The Savannah Zone displays giraffes, gazelles, white rhinoceros, and many species of birds. The building also displays small mammals and insects.

Australia Zone

Australia Zone is found next to the Great Lake. It displays unique birds, reptiles, and amphibians of Australia. The showrooms of the northern part of the house presents animals active at night in reversed lighting scheme. The Hillhouse is also a part of the Australia Zone. It displays southern cassowaries, red kangaroos, and common wombats.

India Zone

India House, the central building was built in 1912 by the plans of Károly Kós and Dezső Zrumeczky. It presents Asiatic lions, striped hyenas among others.

János Xántus House

The building named after the first director of the zoo represents the wildlife of South-East Asian flora and fauna.

Primates Near-at-Hand

The zoo shows especially many species of primates group though not definitely in the neighbourhood of each others. In the South America House, squirrel monkeys are on display. In the Xántus János house, visitors can see Javan surilis. The Madagascar House houses ring-tailed lemurs, black and white ruffed lemurs, red ruffed lemurs, black lemurs, red-fronted lemurs as well as one of Europa's oldest siamangs. The Great Ape house is home to the extremely endangered species of apes including six western lowland gorillas and five Sumatran orangutans. Visitors may also view a troop of hamadryas baboons, golden-bellied mangabeys, emperor tamarins, golden lion tamarins, red-handed tamarins, owl monkeys, white-headed marmosets, and pygmy marmosets.
