= Austrian Zoo Organization =

Austrian Organisation

The Austrian Zoo Organization (Österreichische Zoo Organisation - OZO) is the union of the Austrian, scientifically lead zoos, which keep to the international guidelines of the EAZA (European Association of Zoos and Aquaria).

Member zoos of the OZO fulfill in particular the following criteria:

- High quality in animal husbandry
- Participation in kind preservation and nature protection projects
- Partaking in research activities for the preservation of the diversity of species

OZO's goals include the implementation of the European Union zoo directive within Austria, which is designed to ensure the protection of animals in zoos and in the wild.

== Member zoos ==
- Tiergarten Schönbrunn, Vienna
- Haus des Meeres, Vienna
- Alpenzoo Innsbruck
- Salzburg Zoo
- Schönbrunn Zoo
- Herberstein Zoo, Stutenberg am See
- Zoo Schmiding
- Zoo Linz
- Reptilienzoo Happ
- Lower Austria Museum

== See also ==
- List of zoo associations
