= Zoological Association of America =

Accreditation association for zoos and aquariums in the United States

- Abbreviation: ZAA
- Type: National not-for-profit organization
- Legal status: 501(c)(3) nonprofit organization
- Purpose: The Zoological Association of America (ZAA) is a non-profit, membership-based accrediting organization dedicated to responsible wildlife management, conservation, and education.
- Headquarters: Punta Gorda, Florida, U.S.
- Region served: National
- Method: Accreditation
- Chief Executive Officer: Dr. Kelly George
- Website: zaa.org

The Zoological Association of America (ZAA) is a non-profit organization founded in 2005. It is dedicated to responsible wildlife management, conservation, and education. ZAA is headquartered in Punta Gorda, Florida. It officially accredits zoos and aquariums in both the United States and Canada.

== History ==
In 1987, Ron Blakely, former Sedgwick County Zoo director and co-founder of the Association of Zoos and Aquariums (AZA), invited experts on animal care and zookeeping from public and private institutions to form an organization that would "deal more personally with 'animal-only' related issues and concerns, without the distractions of marketing, graphics, gift shops, etc." compared to AZA, which resulted in the formation of the International Society of Zooculturists (ISZ). In February 2005, the ISZ and sister organization United Zoological Association (UZA) merged to form ZAA.

== Accreditation and activities ==
In order to apply for accreditation, a zoo or aquarium must engage in the care and exhibition of animals with a focus on conservation, as well as perform educational outreach and participate in breeding programs.

As of 2023, ZAA recognizes 65 accredited zoos and aquariums.

The ZAA also holds a yearly Awards Ceremony celebrating accomplishments in exhibit design, education, and breeding, as well as dedication towards the in situ or ex situ conservation of a specific species or specific animal.

== Controversies ==
ZAA has received criticism due to its supposed ease of accreditation and more relaxed requirements for animal care compared to AZA. In 2017, The Humane Society of the United States president Wayne Pacelle claimed that ZAA serves to weaken laws and regulations meant to protect exotic animals in captivity, and serves to obfuscate the more rigorous and strict accreditation requirements of AZA. The organization has also received criticism due to its lack of a ban on breeding white tigers, a practice that AZA banned in 2011 due to the risk of disease as well as other congenital effects due to inbreeding.

ZAA's policies on elephant care have also sparked controversy, as ZAA's elephant care practices allow for free contact. This is opposed to AZA's standard of protected contact in which a sturdy barrier must be between handlers and elephants at all times.

== See also ==
- List of zoo associations
