= National Foundation of Zoological Parks and Aquaria =

Venezuelan zoo association

The National Foundation of Zoological Parks and Aquariums of Venezuela (FUNPZA) was created in 1991. FUNPZA is assigned to the Ministry of Environment of Venezuela (MARN today MPPAmb). The objective of FUNPZA is advising and support to zoological and the national aquariums, as well as the control of its technical and professional performances. The FUNPZA activities involve, the collection of animals, interchange agreements for the best aquarium, and legal support. The development of conservation programs are promoted ex situ and in situ. FUNPZA continues the development of zoological and the Venezuelan aquariums as conservation centers.

== See also ==
- List of zoo associations
