= Japanese Association of Zoos and Aquariums =

Japanese zoological organization

The Japanese Association of Zoos and Aquariums (JAZA, in Japanese: 日本動物園水族館協会, Nihon Dōbutsu-en Suizokukan Kyōkai) is an organization for the zoo and aquarium community in Japan. As of April 30, 2021, JAZA has 90 member zoos and 50 member aquariums. JAZA seeks to protect nature and animals through educational and conservation outreach.

== History ==
JAZA was established in 1939 as a voluntary organization. At the time, it had 16 zoo members and 3 aquarium members. After World War II, JAZA promoted efforts to help restore damaged zoos and aquariums.

By 1965, membership had reached 55 zoos and 33 aquariums, and JAZA was made a corporation under the Social Education Bureau (now the Lifelong Learning Bureau) of the Japanese government's Ministry of Education. A board of directors consisting of 6 representative zoo directors from around the country was created in the same year.

In 2012, JAZA banned member museums from acquiring dolphins through pursuit fishing.

== Education ==
JAZA started conferences for veterinarians and zookeepers in 1953, and for aquarists in 1956. It also established an award system to encourage successful breeding of rare animals and achievements in animal research. JAZA started publishing the "Journal of Japanese Association of Zoological Gardens and Aquariums" in 1959, and began giving qualifying exams for zookeepers and aquarists in 1971.

== Conservation ==
JAZA established the Species Survival Committee JAZA (SSCJ) in 1988. This committee aims to help manage breeding groups of animals in need of conservation and propagation efforts while maintaining the species' genetic diversity. As a result, Japanese zoos currently participate in the breeding efforts for 141 rare animals. Studbooks for the Japanese serow, red-crowned crane, hooded crane, white-naped crane, and Oriental white stork are now kept in Japan, and the SSCJ cooperates with the International Union for Conservation of Nature (IUCN), Survival Service Commission (SSC), and the International Studbook Keepers under the World Association of Zoos and Aquariums (WAZA).

== See also ==
- List of zoo associations
