= List of zoo associations =

This is a partial list of zoo and aquaria associations:

== Global ==
- Alliance of Marine Mammal Parks and Aquariums (AMMPA)
- International Marine Animal Trainers Association (IMATA)
- Species 360 (formerly International Species Information System) (ZIMS database)
- International Zoo Educators Association (IZE)
- World Association of Zoos and Aquariums (WAZA)
- ZooLex Zoo Design Organization (ZooLex)

== Regional ==
- Pan African Association of Zoos and Aquaria (PAAZAB)
- Asociación Latinoamericana de Parques Zoológicos y Acuarios (ALPZA)
- Asociación Mesoamericana y del Caribe de Zoológico i Acuarios (AMACZOOA)
- (American) Association of Zoos and Aquariums (AZA)
- Eurasian Regional Association of Zoos and Aquariums (EARAZA)
- European Association of Zoos and Aquaria (EAZA)
- South Asian Zoo Association for Regional Cooperation (SAZARC)
- South East Asian Zoos Association (SEAZA)
- Zoo and Aquarium Association (ZAA) (formerly ARAZPA)
- Verband der Zoologischen Gärten (VdZ) (Formerly national German association; Includes zoos from Germany, Austria, Switzerland and Spain)

== National ==
- American Association of Zoo Keepers (AAZK)
- Association of Zoos and Aquariums (AZA)
- Asociación Colombiana de Parques Zoológicos y Acuarios (ACOPAZOA)
- Association Nationale des Parcs Zoologiques de France (ANPZ)
- Austrian Zoo Association (OZO)
- Board of Directors of Polish Zoological Gardens and Aquaria (RDPOZiA)
- British and Irish Association of Zoos and Aquariums (BIAZA)
- Canada's Accredited Zoos and Aquariums (CAZA)
- Central Zoo Authority of India (CZA), Governing Authority of all Zoos in India
- Chinese Association of Zoological Gardens & Aquaria (CAZG)
- Danish Association of Zoological Gardens and Aquaria (DAZA)
- Dutch Dier en Park (D&P) 1997.
- Dutch Zoo Federation (NVD)
- German Animal Park Society (DTG)
- Iberian Association of Zoos and Aquaria (AIZA)
- Indonesian Zoological Parks Association (Persatuan Kebun Binatang Se-Indonesia) (PKBSI)
- Israeli Zoo Association (IZA)
- Italian Union of Zoos & Aquaria (UIZA)
- Japanese Association of Zoos and Aquariums (JAZA)
- Malaysian Association of Zoological Parks and Aquaria (MAZPA)
- Mexican Zoo and Aquaria Association (AZCARM)
- National Foundation of Zoological Parks and Aquaria (FUNPZA)
- Society of Brazilian Zoos (Sociedade de Zoológicos do Brasil) (SZB)
- The Swedish Association of Zoos and Aquaria (SAZA or SDF)
- Swiss Association of Scientific Zoos (ZOOSchweiz)
- Syndicat National des Directeurs de Parcs Zoologiques Français (SNDPZ)
- Union of Czech and Slovak Zoological Gardens (UCSZ)
- Zoo Outreach Organisation (ZOO), India is an NGO
- Zoological Association of America (ZAA)
- Zoological Survey of India (ZSI)

== See also ==
- Zoological society (disambiguation)
