= Edmonton Valley Zoo =

- One of the eight variations of the logo.

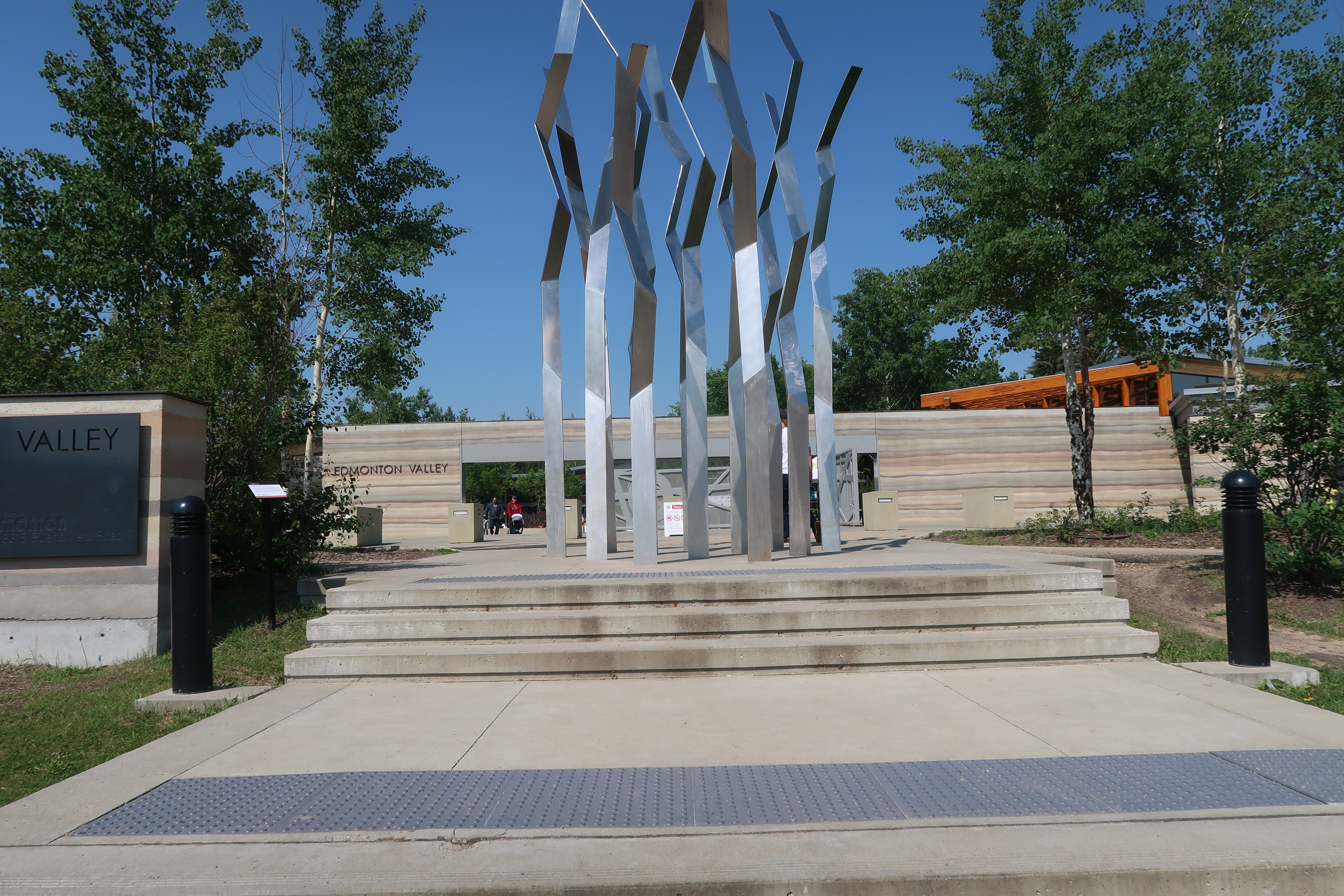
- Entrance to the zoo
- Interactive map of Edmonton Valley Zoo
- 53°30′41″N 113°33′14″W
- Slogan: Get Closer
- Date opened: July 1, 1959
- Location: Edmonton, Alberta, Canada
- Land area: 0.18 km^{2} (0.069 sq mi)
- No. of animals: >350 (2020)
- No. of species: 100
- Annual visitors: ~342,000
- Memberships: CAZA, WAZA
- Director: Gary Dewar
- Public transit: ODT (to South Campus/Fort Edmonton Park station and West Edmonton Mall Transit Centre)
- Website: www.edmonton.ca/attractions_events/edmonton-valley-zoo

The Edmonton Valley Zoo (sometimes known simply as the Valley Zoo) is a zoo located in Edmonton, Alberta's river valley. The Edmonton Valley Zoo is owned and operated by the City of Edmonton and is open 364 days a year, closing only on Christmas. The zoo is currently accredited by Canada's Accredited Zoos and Aquariums and is one of three accredited zoos in Alberta.

== History ==
The Valley Zoo opened on July 1, 1959, as a replacement for a previous Edmonton Zoo (Borden Park Zoo) which was torn down to expand Northlands Park (now Northlands). The zoo is home to over 350 exotic and native animals and houses over 100 different species. In 2007, the Edmonton Valley Zoo launched the Makira Conservation Fund Initiative in honour of their newly unveiled lemur habitat, named the Makira Outpost after the Makira forest region in Madagascar. In addition to this cause, the zoo also raises funds and awareness for other endangered animals such as red pandas, through the Red Panda Network, and various other conservation efforts. This facility also promotes animal conservation through its participation in the Species Survival Plan, an international effort led by the American Zoo and Aquarium Association which aims to restore endangered animal populations to the wild, for a variety of species. They have raised six red panda cubs since 2007.

The Edmonton Valley Zoo's 2005 Master Plan was approved by Edmonton City Council, allocating $50 million in capital funding. With the first project, Arctic Shores completed, the second phase, The Wander Trail, opened in 2013.

== Exhibits ==
Location of Valley Zoo in Edmonton

=== Inner Zoo ===
The Inner Zoo is the area of the zoo that was originally the Storyland Valley Zoo. The vast majority of the area was constructed in 1959. Animals that live within this area of the zoo during summer include: emus, snowy owl, and burrowing owls.

=== Makira Outpost ===
The Makira Outpost, a primate exhibit, opened to the public in 2007 and is named after the Makira forest region in Madagascar. The exhibit focuses on housing lemurs and raising awareness of Malagasy wildlife conservation.

==== Design and features ====
The design and construction of Makira Outpost were carried out by Group2 Architecture Engineering. The exhibit consists of three indoor enclosures, each connected to an outdoor habitat. Two enclosures lead to separate fenced outdoor yards, while the third connects to a larger island habitat. The island and moat were created from a pre-existing paved area, with mature elm trees incorporated into the design. The habitat relies on a water moat rather than solid walls, making use of lemurs' natural aversion to water to maintain a barrier-free appearance. Railings are positioned to keep visitors out of the habitat, rather than confining the animals themselves.

The architectural structure of the Makira Outpost features a tent-like floating roof supported by concrete columns wrapped in textured rope. Steel tube branches connect to laminated wood beams overhead. The building is designed to be climatically responsive, supporting naturalistic living conditions for its animal inhabitants.

==== Resident species ====
As of 2025, Makira Outpost houses ring-tailed lemurs (Lemur Catta), a mongoose lemur (Eulemur mongoz), and a black-and-white ruffed lemur (Varecia variegata). Each primate group shares its enclosure with an African spurred tortoise (Centrochelys sulcata).

==== Conservation initiatives ====
The opening of the Makira Outpost coincided with the launch of the Makira Conservation Fund Initiative in 2007.

=== Nature's Wild Backyard ===
In 2019 the zoo opened phase one of Nature's Wild Backyard. Phase one includes an immersive exhibit for the zoo's red panda as well as the year-round Urban Farm, home to numerous domestic species. In addition to the animal enclosures the Urban Farm has a restaurant, washrooms, and ice cream stand. Phase II of Nature's Wild Backyard is not completely funded.

==== Urban Farm ====
The Urban Farm is home to the zoo's farm animals which include Juliana pigs, chickens, ponies, goats, baby doll sheep and rabbits.

=== Carnivore Alley ===
The Carnivore Alley has the majority of the zoo's carnivores, such as red foxes, snow leopards, Amur tigers, Arctic wolves, Canada lynx and serval.

=== Elephant House and Exhibit ===
The Valley Zoo's Elephant House is home to Lucy, a female Asian elephant who is from Sri Lanka in 1975 and came to the zoo at the age of two on May 19, 1977. The elephant house is currently closed due to Lucy's retirement from public life. In 2025, Fern Levitt directed a documentary film funded by CBC titled, Lucy: The Stolen Life of Elephants. There is controversy surrounding the decisions not to move Lucy to a sanctuary where she would be with her own kind.

=== Saito Centre ===
The Saito Centre is named after the zoo's former veterinarian who died shortly before construction of the building. Originally designed as a winter holding building, it now houses all the zoo's fragile animals. It is winter home to all the zoo's primate species as well. It is also home to the reptile and nocturnal wing, Froggery (over ten species of amphibians), and many of the zoo's smaller animals. In 2017 an indoor exhibit that houses temporary animal exhibits was created.

=== African Veldt ===
The African Veldt is home to endangered Grévy's zebras. In November 2025 the zebras were relocated to different zoos so that the exhibit could be redeveloped.

=== Polar Extremes: Arctic Shores ===
The Arctic Shores replicates an Arctic coast. Harbour seals and northern fur seals can be viewed swimming underwater.

=== Back Paddocks ===
The Back Paddocks are home to the zoos larger hoof stock and include Bactrian camel, reindeers, and a Sichuan takin group.

=== Birds of Prey ===
The Birds of Prey area features "non-releasable" raptors, some of which are in outreach programs. Some species include Eurasian eagle owl and peregrine falcon.

=== R. Mollot Arctic Wolf Habitat ===
The Edmonton Valley Zoo unveiled its new Arctic wolf habitat in April 2025, marking a significant advancement in the zoo's commitment to animal welfare and conservation education. Named the R. Mollot Arctic Wolf Habitat, this expansive enclosure offers a naturalistic environment designed to reflect the wolves' native Arctic tundra.

The $1.8 million project was fully funded through the collaborative efforts of the Valley Zoo Development Society, the Government of Alberta, the Malliner Charitable Foundation, and private donors. The Valley Zoo Development Society not only spearheaded the fundraising campaign but also oversaw the construction of the habitat.

Spanning 5,000 square meters (1.24 acres), the habitat is the largest of its kind in Alberta. It includes a climate-controlled indoor area equipped with heating and air conditioning to ensure year-round comfort for the wolves. The outdoor environment features indigenous flora, large boulders, fallen logs, a pond with a waterfall, and an underground den, all designed to encourage natural behaviors.

The habitat houses six Arctic wolves: Tundra, a long-time resident of the zoo, and two females, Aspen and Anuri, who arrived from France in February, 2024. In May of 2026, three wolf pups were born to parents Tundra and Aspen that have yet to be named. Animal care staff are managing the gradual introduction of the wolves to each other to ensure appropriate social dynamics within the habitat.

This development aligns with the Edmonton Valley Zoo's broader revitalization efforts aimed at enhancing animal habitats and promoting conservation awareness. The zoo's leadership emphasizes that the new habitat not only improves the quality of life for the wolves but also serves as an educational platform to inform visitors about Arctic wildlife and the challenges these animals face in the wild.

== Lucy the elephant ==
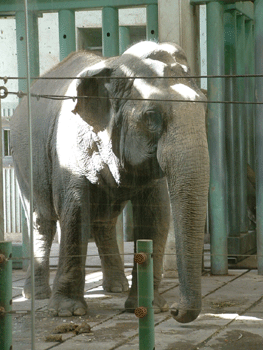
Lucy is a female Asian elephant that resides at the Valley Zoo

=== Early life and arrival ===
Lucy is an Asian elephant (Elephas maximus) who has resided at the Edmonton Valley Zoo since 1977. She was born in Sri Lanka and arrived at the zoo on May 19, 1977, after being orphaned and raised at the Pinnawala Elephant Orphanage and became a central part of the zoo's early animal collection. At the time of her arrival, Lucy was developmentally assessed to be approximately two years old. During this period in time, many zoos in North America acquired elephants to attract visitors and promote education about exotic species.

Asian elephants typically have an average lifespan of around 45 years, although individuals in human care can sometimes live longer. The Edmonton Valley Zoo celebrates Lucy's birthday annually on Canada Day (July 1). The zoo decided in 2021 that it would not acquire any further elephants.

=== Living conditions ===
Due to Edmonton’s northern climate, special accommodations were created for Lucy’s care. The zoo constructed a heated elephant house with three rooms, rubberized and sand-covered floors to promote comfort and foot health, and textured walls that assist with skin care. The building is heated by large vents and the floors are sloped to allow drainage.

=== Care and health ===
Lucy's health has been carefully monitored and managed by a team of specialized veterinarians since she arrived at the zoo in 1977. Over the years, her health assessments have been publicly shared, with independent veterinary experts reviewing her condition annually (see Past Health Updates and Assessments).

One of the key health concerns for Lucy is her chronic respiratory condition, which includes severe hypoxemia and hypercapnia. These conditions make her vulnerable to stress and respiratory complications, especially during transport. For this reason, veterinary experts have consistently recommended that Lucy not be relocated, as the risks to her health would outweigh any potential benefits. The most recent health assessment, conducted in September 2024, reaffirmed this stance, noting that Lucy’s health would be jeopardized by any relocation.

The Edmonton Valley Zoo has states that they remain committed to providing Lucy with the highest standard of care, cooperating with external veterinary experts to ensure transparency. The zoo also maintains CAZA (Canadian Association of Zoos and Aquariums) accreditation, ensuring that its facilities and practices meet national standards. Lucy’s ongoing health assessments are made publicly available to ensure accountability in her care.

=== Retirement ===
In 2020, the Edmonton Valley Zoo began transitioning Lucy from public appearances and programs into retirement. As part of this transition, Lucy was gradually removed from interactive encounters and talks with visitors. The elephant building, previously accessible to the public, was officially closed for drop-in access in 2020. The zoo emphasized that Lucy would be the last elephant to call Edmonton home, marking the end of the zoo's elephant program.

In her retirement, Lucy is given the freedom to roam the zoo grounds with no restrictions on her movements. She is not confined to specific public or non-public spaces, and she has significant autonomy over where she wanders and at what pace.

=== Controversy ===
Lucy's welfare has been a subject of public debate for over two decades. Animal welfare organizations and advocacy groups have raised concerns about the suitability of her living conditions at the Edmonton Valley Zoo, specifically in relation to the climate and her solitary confinement. These groups have advocated for Lucy’s transfer to an elephant sanctuary, ideally in a warmer climate, where she could live with other elephants in a more natural environment.

==== Concerns and advocacy ====
Various animal welfare organizations, including Zoocheck, PETA, and Lucy’s Edmonton Advocates Project (LEAP), a Facebook group made up of concerned individuals, have led campaigns for Lucy’s relocation. High-profile supporters, including celebrities such as Bob Barker and Cher, have also publicly advocated for Lucy's relocation to an accredited sanctuary in the United States.

In 2007, Zoocheck commissioned a behavioral observation study, which concluded that Lucy displayed signs of lethargy and stereotypic behaviors. The report recommended her transfer to a sanctuary, arguing that elephants require social companionship and larger spaces to thrive.

In 2012, Zoocheck and PETA urged the Supreme Court of Canada to consider Lucy’s relocation, but the court refused to hear the case. Five years later, in 2017, Zoocheck and Voice for Animals Edmonton challenged the Province of Alberta’s decision to grant the Edmonton Valley Zoo an operating permit. However, this case was dismissed after the court ruled that they did not have standing. The decision was appealed, but a written ruling in late 2019 upheld the dismissal.

===== Jane Goodall Institute of Canada’s position =====
In early 2021, renowned primatologist Jane Goodall recorded a video statement in which she urged the Edmonton City Council to take action to “free Lucy the lonely elephant.” While Dr. Goodall’s message highlighted her concerns for Lucy, it contained several inaccuracies regarding the elephant’s health and the care she receives at the Edmonton Valley Zoo. These misrepresentations prompted the zoo to respond publicly with a letter addressing and correcting the false claims made in her statement. In response to concerns raised by the statement, Dr. Goodall directed the Jane Goodall Institute of Canada to conduct a comprehensive review of Lucy’s history and the independent expert medical evaluations she has undergone. After reviewing the findings, the Jane Goodall Institute publicly supported the zoo’s position, confirming that all veterinarians involved in Lucy’s evaluations were highly qualified and that their consensus was clear: Lucy's well-being would be at risk if relocated. The Institute’s review concluded that Lucy’s care at the zoo is appropriate and that her continued residency in Edmonton is in her best interest.

===== Animal Justice CAZA complaint =====
The Edmonton Valley Zoo garnered significant media and public attention following the release of the City’s 2023 to 2026 Capital Budget. The Animal Enclosure Renewal and Enhancement profile indicated that a number of enclosures do not meet the Canadian Association of Zoos and Aquariums (CAZA) standards. However, it should have been more accurately stated that these enclosures required replacement due to their age and the condition of the infrastructure to continue meeting CAZA standards.

In response to concerns raised by Animal Justice Canada, a complaint was filed with CAZA, alleging that the Edmonton Valley Zoo was not meeting accreditation standards. Despite this complaint, the Edmonton Valley Zoo had been thoroughly inspected in 2022 and remained fully accredited.

CAZA was required to investigate the claim and, on May 6, 2023, confirmed that the investigation had been completed and the case was closed. CAZA found no issues with the zoo, affirming that its systems and enclosures meet CAZA accreditation standards. Additionally, employee protocols are in place to ensure the safety of animals, staff, and guests. As outlined in the CAZA procedural manual, the Ethics and Compliance Committee accepted the findings of the investigation team, deeming the matter resolved. The zoo continues to maintain its CAZA accreditation.

===== Lucy: The Stolen Life of Elephants =====
The 2025 documentary Lucy: The Stolen Life of Elephants has drawn attention to concerns regarding Lucy's captivity at the Edmonton Valley Zoo, comparing her living conditions to those of elephants in sanctuary settings. However, the film has been criticized for presenting a one-sided view of her situation, overlooking key details from independent veterinary assessments and the zoo’s efforts to improve Lucy’s living environment.

The documentary suggests that Lucy’s health is deteriorating due to her captivity, a claim that contradicts multiple evaluations from independent experts over the years. The vast majority of these experts have consistently reaffirmed the zoo’s decision to keep Lucy in Edmonton, citing her complex health issues, particularly her chronic respiratory problems. These experts have advised that relocation could pose significant health risks, particularly considering Lucy’s age and her medical history. Furthermore, the documentary does not fully address recent changes in Lucy’s care, such as her retirement in 2020, which has allowed her to live in a more relaxed, less public environment.

Critics also point out that Fern Levitt, the director of the documentary, has a history of controversial portrayals of animal captivity in her previous work, which raises concerns about the objectivity of Lucy: The Stolen Life of Elephants. This history calls into question whether the documentary presents a balanced perspective on Lucy’s situation, or if it selectively highlights certain aspects while downplaying others that may not support its narrative.

==== Veterinary assessments and zoo response ====
Since 2009, the Edmonton Valley Zoo has consistently published Lucy’s annual health assessments, conducted by independent veterinary experts. These assessments, available on the City of Edmonton’s official Lucy News page, have consistently concluded that Lucy’s health would be at risk if she were relocated.

In February 2021, the Jane Goodall Institute of Canada released a statement, following an independent third-party veterinary review, affirming that "the risks of moving Lucy outweigh the potential benefits to her."

Similarly, in October 2022, the animal advocacy organization Free the Wild (co-founded by Cher) corroborated these findings, agreeing that relocation would likely endanger Lucy’s life. Sagan Cowne, trustee and director of communications for Free the Wild, remarked:

“I’ve travelled the world and I’ve been to many zoos and sanctuaries and circuses across the globe. What I’ve seen here in terms of commitment from the zoo staff is extraordinary. It’s definitely a very good baseline from which any zoo should look to (to care for) their animals”

The most recent assessment, conducted in September 2024 by Dr. Dennis Schmitt and Mr. Daryl Hoffman, reaffirmed that Lucy is not fit for transport. The experts noted that Lucy’s chronic respiratory issues, including severe hypoxemia and hypercapnia, make her highly susceptible to stress and respiratory complications during travel. Additionally, her advanced age and lack of exposure to other elephants complicate the feasibility of relocation. Dr. Schmitt stated that she likely has low antibody levels to Elephant Endotheliotropic Herpesvirus (EEHV) and advised against moving her to a facility with other elephants or introducing elephants to her, due to the high risk that she has no protection against succumbing to EEHV. The assessment concluded that transporting Lucy would pose significant health risks.

To ensure Lucy’s care remains in line with industry standards, the zoo also receives an annual variance letter from the Canadian Association of Zoos and Aquariums (CAZA). This letter confirms that Lucy’s unique situation and care plan are compliant with CAZA guidelines, even though the zoo's climate and her solitary conditions are factors requiring special consideration.

==== Legal and regulatory challenges ====
Zoocheck Canada has also utilized legal avenues in its attempts to have Lucy relocated. In 2012, Zoocheck and PETA appealed to the Supreme Court of Canada to reconsider Lucy’s living conditions and transfer her to a sanctuary, but the Court refused to hear the case. In 2017, Zoocheck and Voice for Animals Edmonton challenged in court the Province of Alberta’s decision to grant the Edmonton Valley Zoo an operating permit. This case was dismissed as the court denied them standing. Zoocheck and Voice for Animals Edmonton appealed the decision during a hearing on March 7, 2018. A written decision in late 2019 upheld the dismissal.

== Gallery ==
Edmonton Valley Zoo
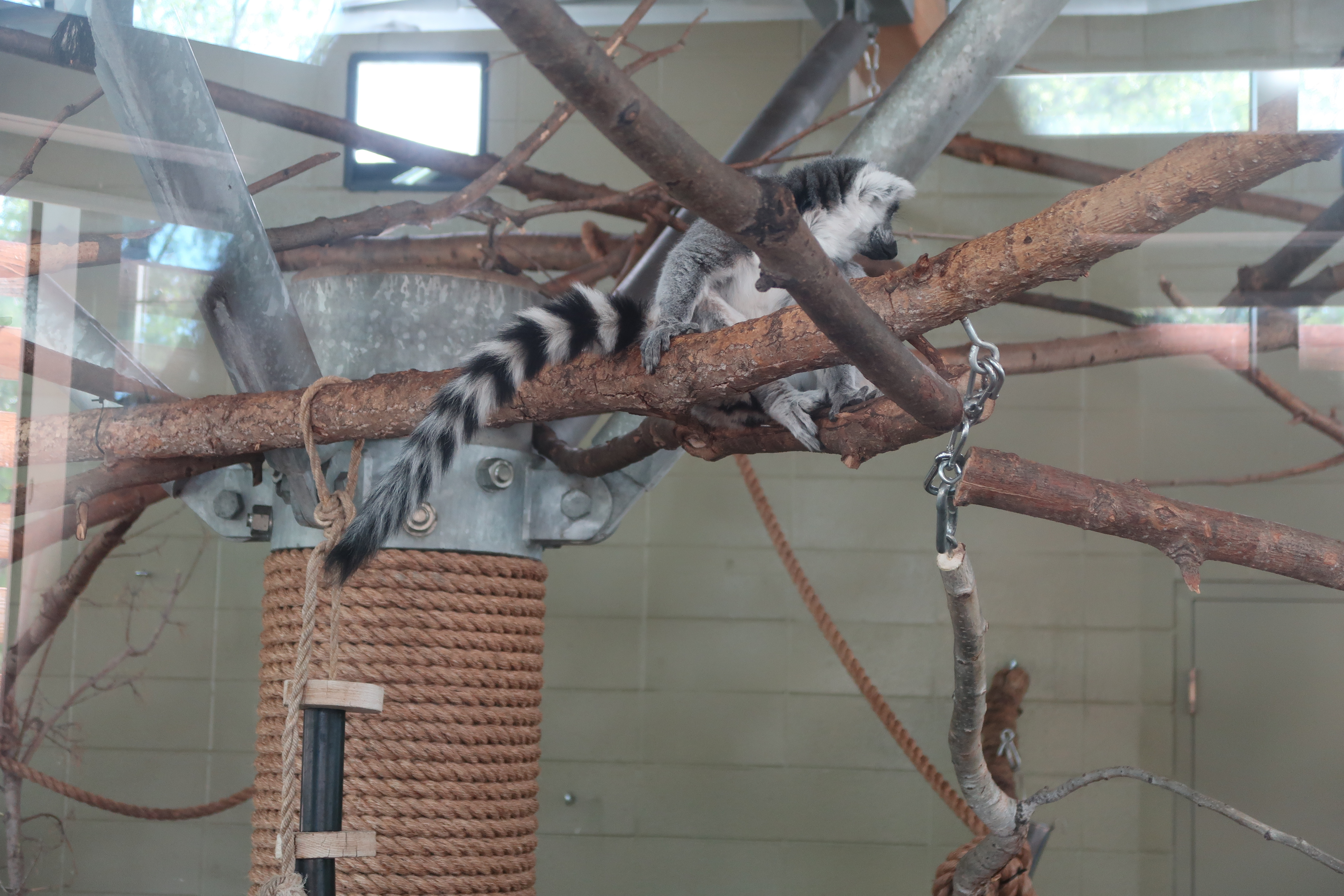
Makira Outpost

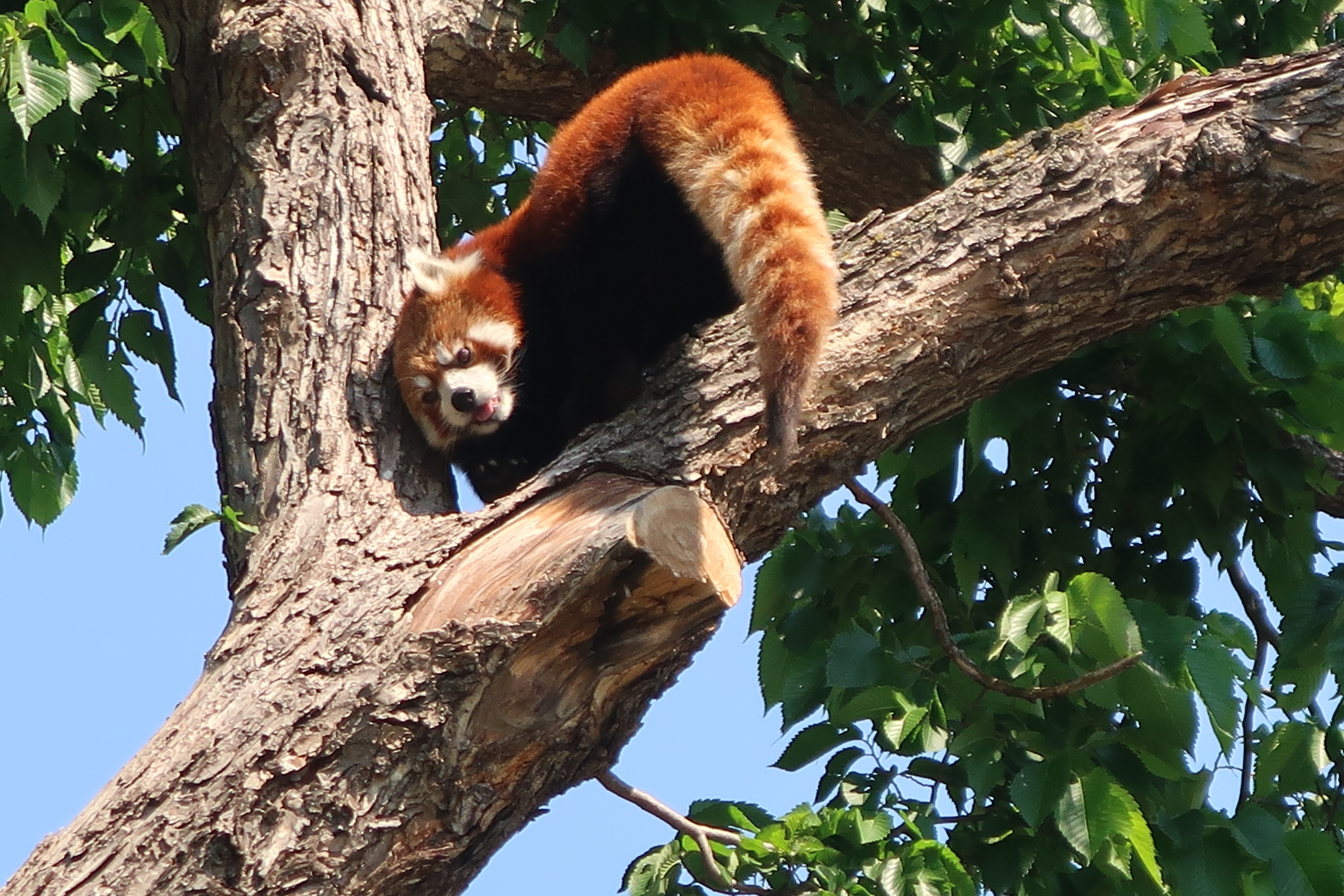
Red panda

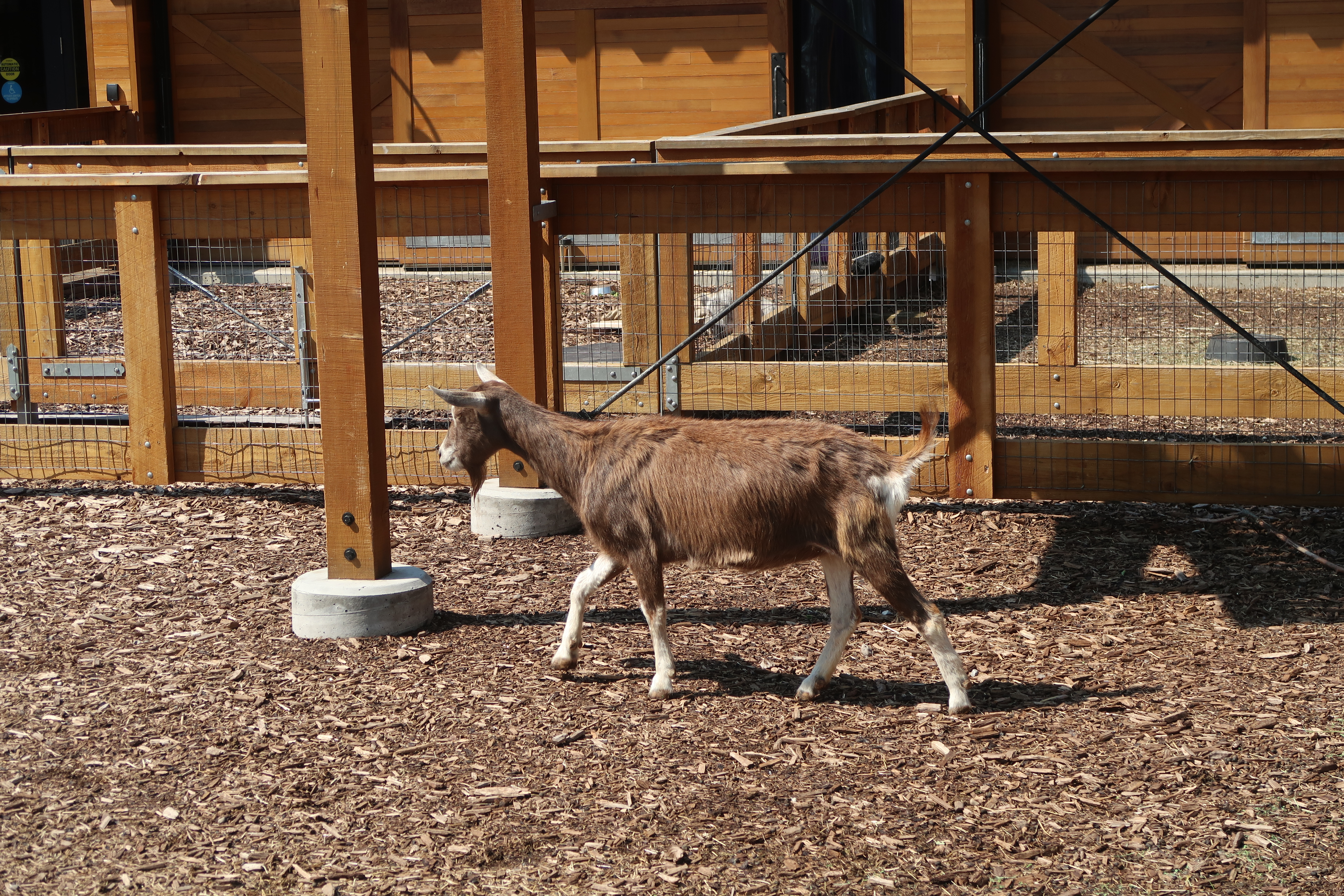
Urban Farm

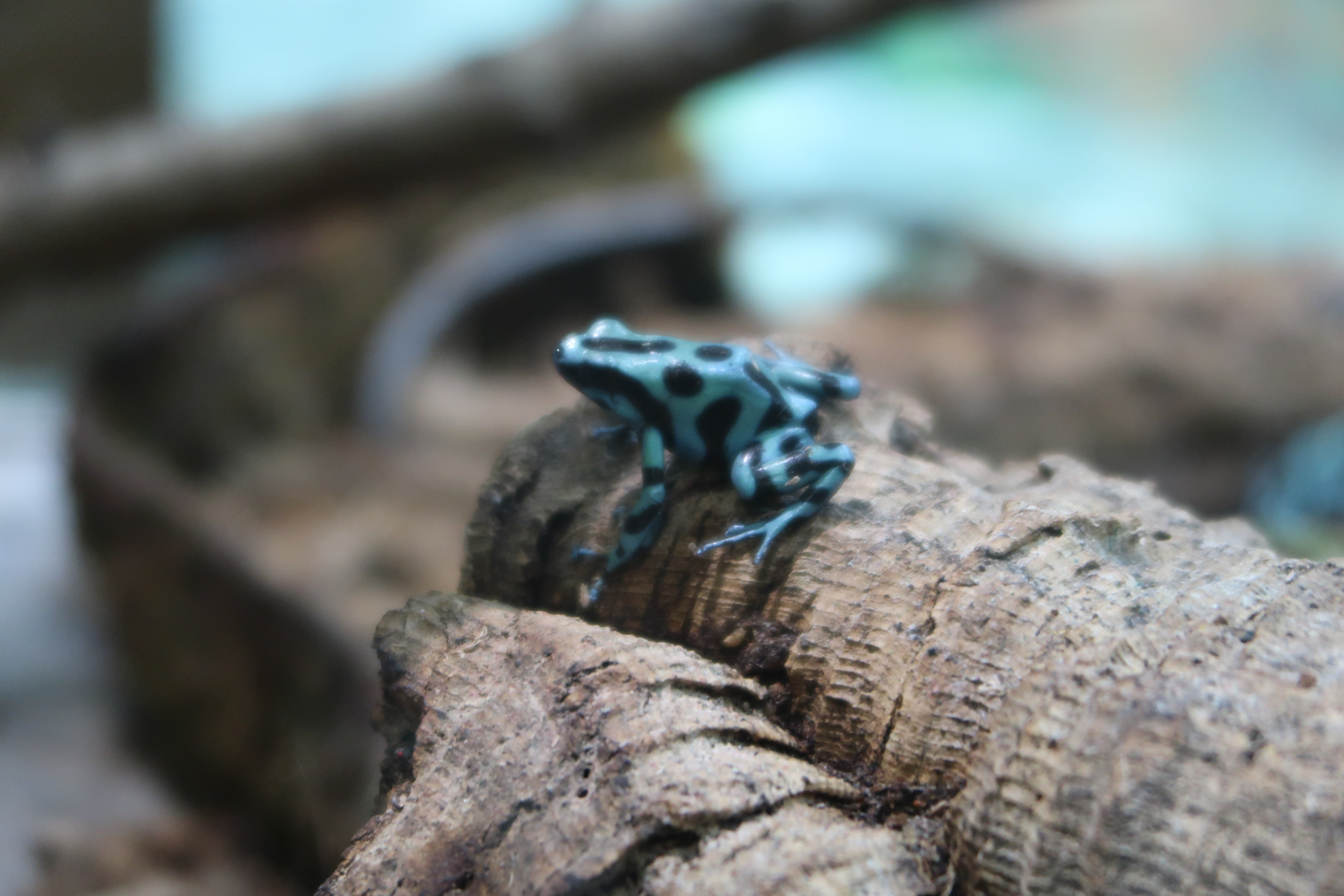
Poison dart frog in Saito Centre

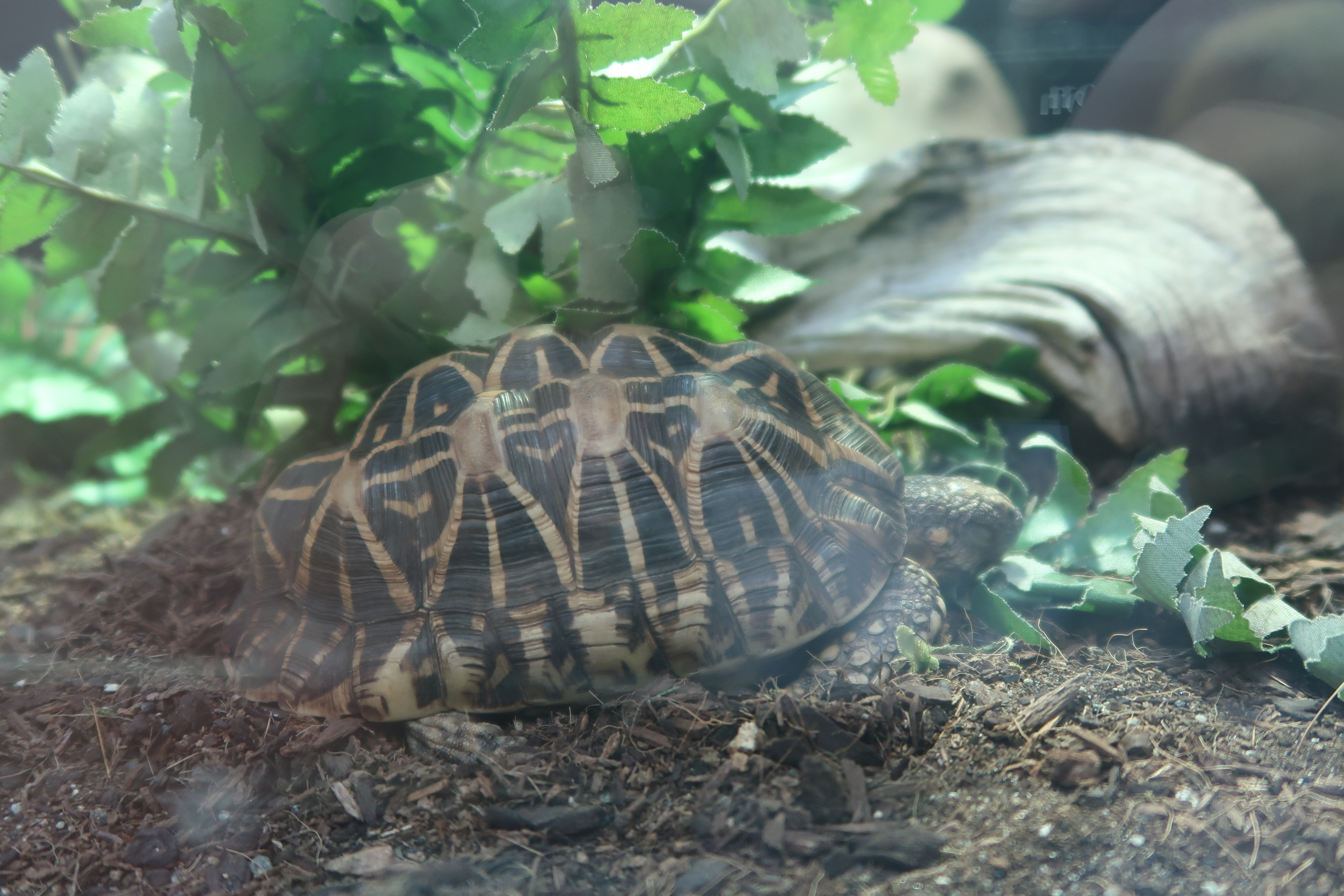
Tortoise in Saito Centre

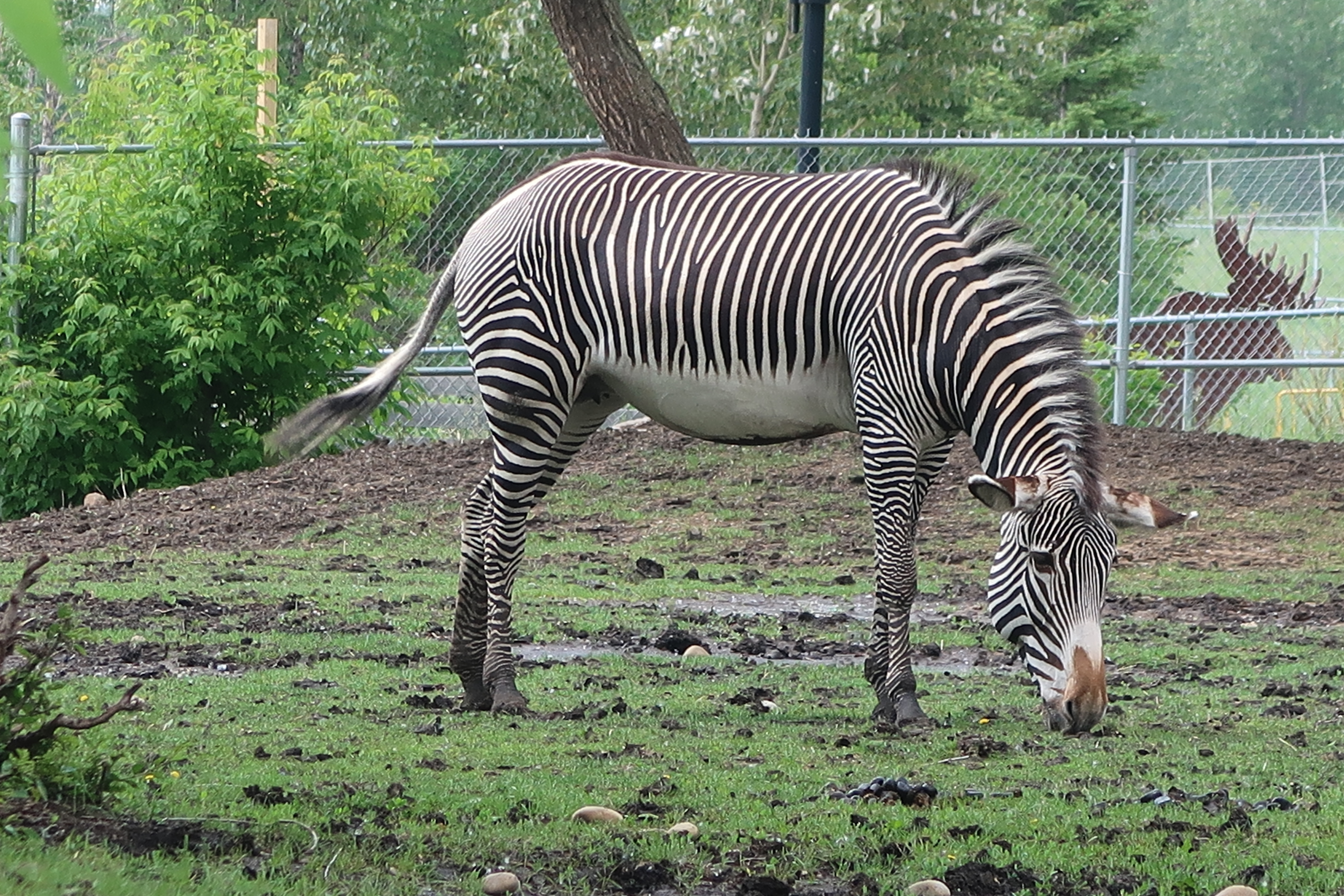
Grevy's Zebra

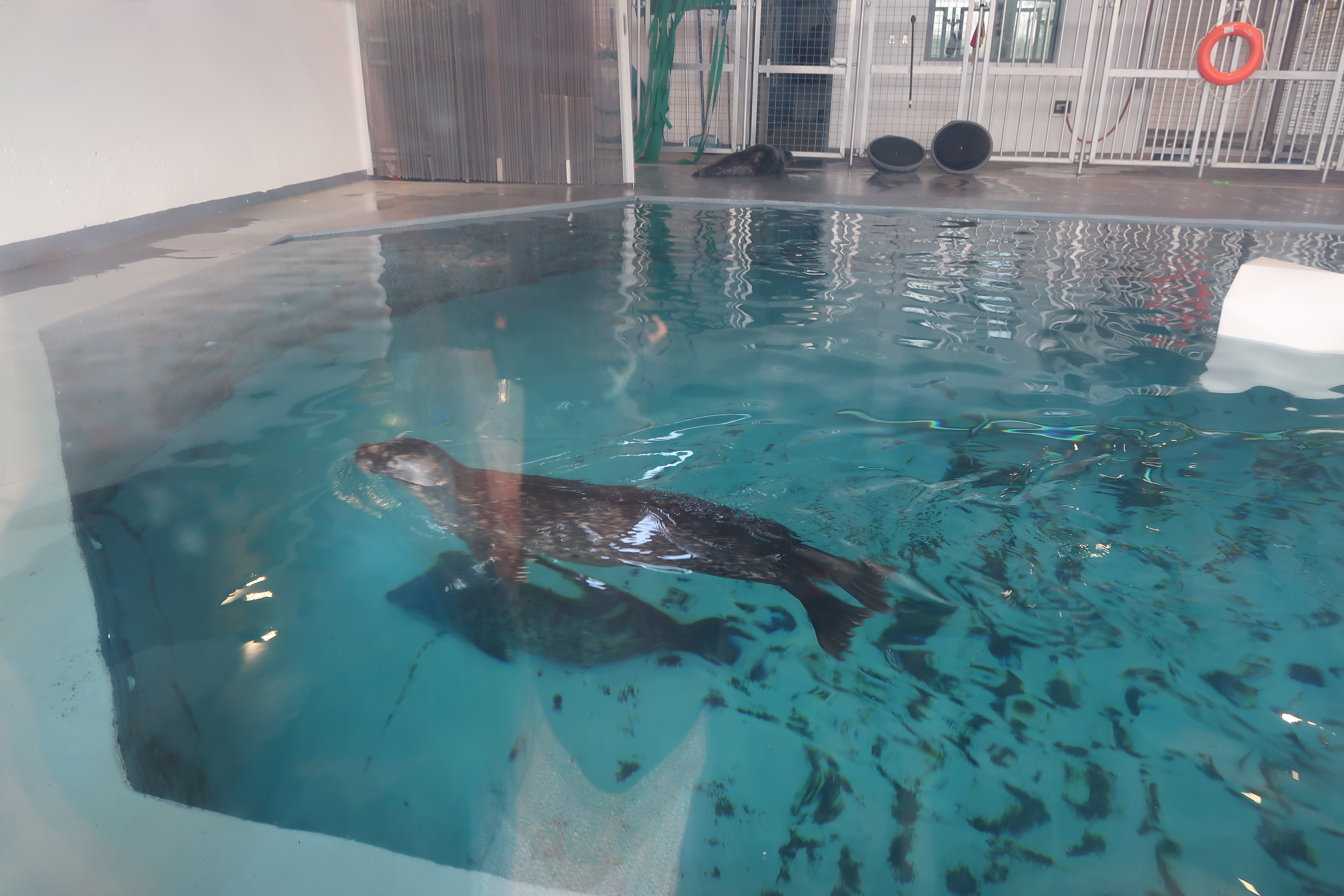
Seals

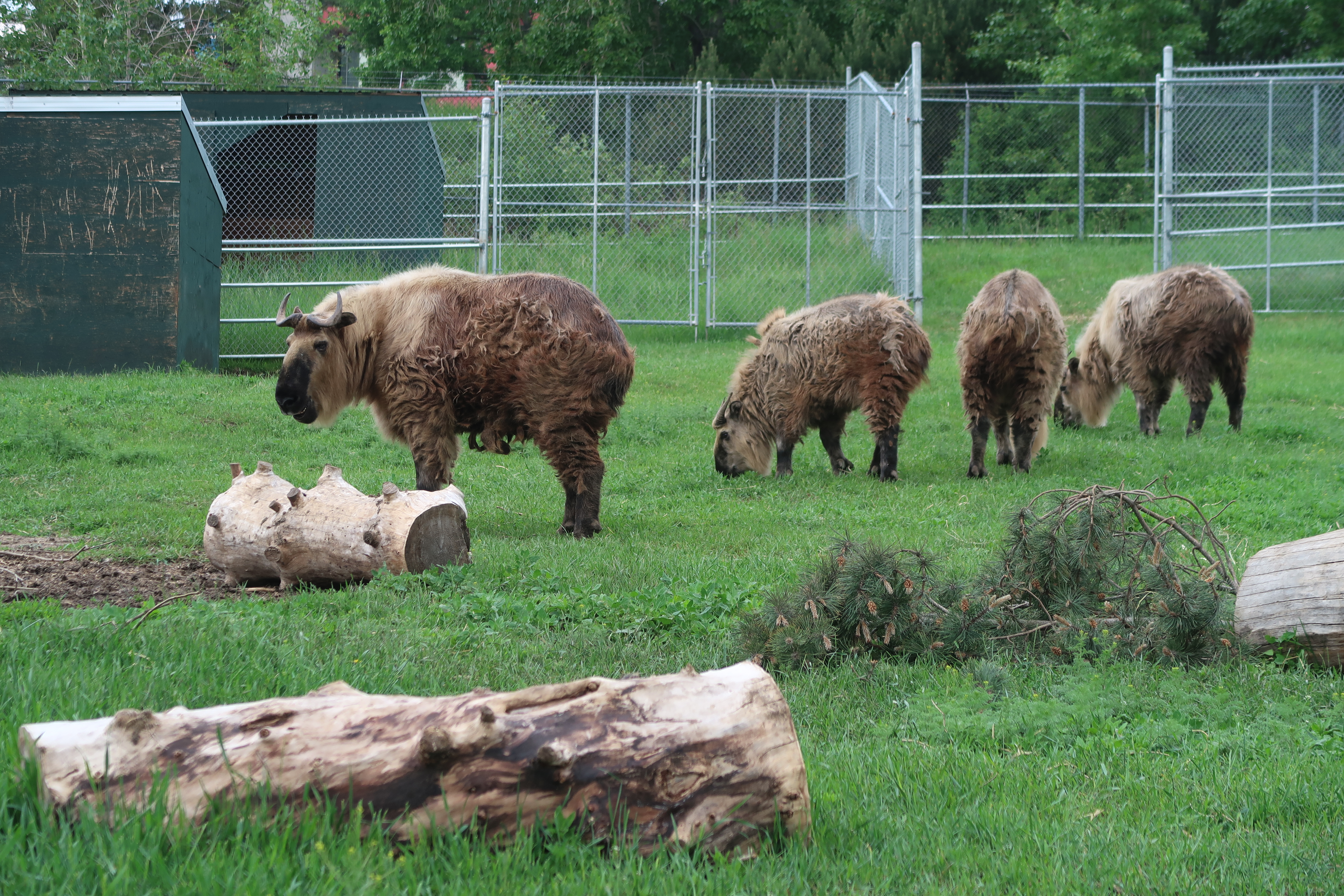
Sichuan Takin
