= British Columbia Wildlife Park =

Wildlife Park

- Interactive map of British Columbia Wildlife Park
- 50°39′14.41″N 120°4′49.69″W
- Date opened: August 16, 1966
- Location: Kamloops, British Columbia, CAN
- Land area: 106 acres (43 ha)
- No. of species: 65
- Memberships: CAZA
- Website: www.bcwildlife.org

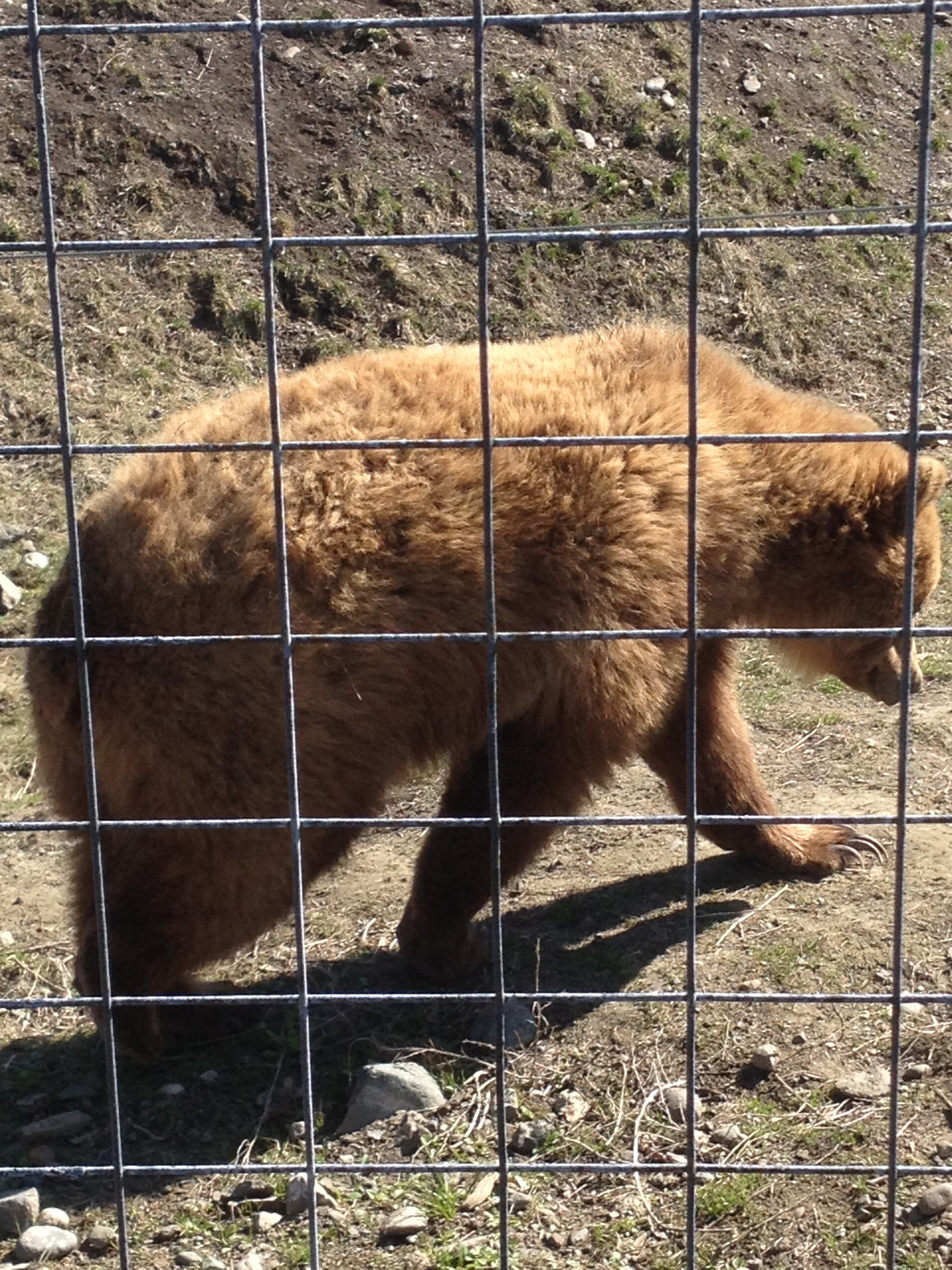
Grizzly bear at British Columbia Wildlife Park

The British Columbia Wildlife Park is a 106-acre (43 ha) zoo located in Kamloops, British Columbia.

The British Columbia Wildlife Park is an accredited member of the Canadian Association of Zoos and Aquariums (CAZA).

== History ==
=== The proposal ===
In 1965, the Kamloops Chamber of Commerce felt that Kamloops was a 'one-night stop' for tourists and that more attractions would be needed to convince visitors to stay longer, which would benefit the local economy. On February 15, 1965, the Kamloops Chamber of Commerce were approached by animal enthusiast and eventual wildlife park founder John Moelaert, who proposed that an idea of a zoological park would be the perfect attraction to boost the local economy, because it would attract both visitors and residents.

=== Public meeting ===
A month later a public meeting was organized by the Chamber of Commerce at the old Kamloops Library on March 17, 1965, to discuss the possibility of establishing a wildlife park. Other than John Moelaert, the public meeting were also attended by Kamloops City Council aldermen Tony Andrew, Gene Cavazzi and Malcolm Grant, as well as, North Kamloops Town Council alderman Albert McGowan, Head of the Kamloops branch of the British Columbia Fish and Wildlife Len Smith, and architect Bud Aubrey (who would eventually provide drawings for the buildings and exhibits for the wildlife park). At the meeting, John Moelaert explained to the public his idea to have a zoological attraction and that to achieve this goal he needs to:

1. Set up a non-profit society;
2. Acquire large property for spacious exhibits and;
3. Develop the facility as a first class institution.

John Moelaert recalled that at the meeting, "Most of the people were underwhelmed," and that, "Not a few were clearly hostile," but hostilities were present. Opponents of Moelaert's proposal, argued that Kamloops needed a public indoor swimming pool, better facilities for its senior citizens and that they don't feel comfortable with animals being locked up in cages. Moelaert would make it clear to the public that, "The well-being of animals was as important to me as it was to my critics," and went further to explain, "That a zoological park (The name wildlife park came into use later) could be a major recreational, educational and conservation project." However, opposition to Moelaert's plan was still strong and support for his proposal was lukewarm as different questions were being asked on: How is he going to find a 100 acres (0.40 km^{2})? Why not he start small with a few acres? How is he going to pay for it? Moelaert would admit that he did not have all the answers and reminded the audience at the public meeting that his purpose for this meeting was to start the formation of a society so that they can gather information to answer those questions and to determine whether having a zoological park was even feasible. Moelaert then asked for donations for the proposed society and received a $10 bill from Ralph Thomas, General Manager of the Kamloops Pulp Mill and received an additional $5 from Reg Waugh. The public meeting would end after it appointed Jim Watson, Mrs S. Dow, lawyer Andrew Berna, Chamber of Commerce representative Fred Nesbitt, and John Moelaert as committee members to pursue the matter of setting up a society.

=== The formation of the zoological society ===
After public approval, the Greater Kamloops Zoological Society was formed on April 6, 1965, after its constitution and bylaws were prepared free of charge by local lawyers, Andrew Berna (committee member) and Patrick Dohm. After the establishment of an executive committee, the society was then officially incorporated and registered under the British Columbia Societies Act, a few weeks later. Soon after their establishment, the Greater Kamloops Zoological Society started its membership drive. Membership to join the Greater Kamloops Zoological Society was only two dollars a year and included four free visits to the future zoo. The membership drive quickly reached over the 100-mark, which included renowned British Columbia citizens such as former Justice Minister Davie Fulton, Highways Minister Phil Gaglardi, Kamloops Mayor Peter Wing, Executive Director of the British Columbia Wildlife Federation Howard Paish, and Vancouver Public Aquarium founder and director Dr. Murray Newman.

=== Site negotiations with Molson Breweries ===
After their successful membership drive, the Greater Kamloops Zoological Society's next task was to find a suitable site and soon entered into talks with Molson Breweries who owned an unused 1,000-acre (4.0 km^{2}) hops farm about 10 miles (16 km) east from what was then the boundary of Kamloops. Molson officials showed interest in the park proposal, but wanted several reports from the society to show the zoo's viability. The main concern of Molson Breweries was that the zoo's project would become an eyesore for lack of funds and would reflect poorly on their company. With the society's bank account having only more than a few hundred dollars, convincing Molson Breweries that the society can carry out their development plans was a formidable task, since raising the required funds for the construction of buildings and exhibits would cost more. Molson's concerns of the park's feasibility caused negotiations between zoo founder, John Moelaert and Molson's public relations director, Alex Jupp to be on-going. Knowing his society's financial situation and how it is effecting the ongoing negotiations with Molson Breweries to donate land, Moelaert managed to persuade local architects (see above – The Public Meeting), surveyors, engineers, contractors, carpenters, electricians, bricklayers, etc. to donate their services or building materials if Molson's land were to be transferred to the society. After being successful to convince local businesses to donate their services, Molson Breweries became convinced of the park's viability and donated 106 acres (0.43 km^{2}) of land to the Greater Kamloops Zoological Society on February 11, 1966, after almost a year of negotiations.

=== Construction and opening of the park ===
Four months after receiving the land transfer from Molson and receiving donated materials and services (labour, concrete, bulldozer, flat deck, lumber, doors, toilet stalls, water mains, etc.), the Greater Kamloops Zoological Society started planning and designing their new site for construction. Majority of the donated materials and services, mostly came from Kamloops, however, much of the donated materials also came from the Lower Mainland and as far away in Peterborough, Ontario. With the donated materials and services available, founder John Moelaert would oversee the construction and became the project's first manager on June 1, 1966. On that same day, Royal Canadian Mounted Police Staff Sgt. Gordon Simons succeeded John Moelaert as president of the society, since Moelaert was now in charge of managing construction. The first item on Moelaert's development was to drill for an abundant supply of excellent water so that the zoo can have its own independent water supply. On their first drilling attempt, Moelaert found what he was looking for – an abundant water supply, and soon after that, development and construction began. After Moelaert discovered his independent water supply, BC Hydro crews started to provide electricity to the zoo, by constructing underground services in order to avoid unsightly overhead lines. Soon after BC Tel started installing the phone lines and roads were soon built. Construction of the zoo would only take two months to complete, and it was officially opened to the public on August 16, 1966. The first exhibits to be shown to the public was a 2-acre (8,100 m^{2}) enclosure that featured two moose, Demitrius and his female companion, Gerda, and other enclosures that included the white-tailed deer, the fallow deer, and the Canada geese. After operating its business under the Kamloops Zoo, the society would change its name to the Wildlife Park Society of British Columbia and rename the site as British Columbia Wildlife Park on November 1, 1966, in order to recognize the support that they have received from both the Thompson-Okanagan region and the Lower Mainland. In its first 80 days of operation, the park drew in 7,000 people before it was closed to the public for the winter season. A year later, on May 20, 1967, the children's zoo was officially opened by Phil Gaglardi in the presence of North Kamloops mayor Jack Chilton, alderman Gene Cavazzi representing Kamloops, society president, Gordon Simons, founder John Moeleart, and 500 spectators who attended the Victoria Day event. After the event, the BC Wildlife Park received wide media attention from the Vancouver Sun and The Province, which caused provincial tour buses to include the park on their itinerary and school buses brought students for free visits coming from as far as Victoria to visit the park. A month later on June 8, 1967, visitors to the park witnessed the birth of a white-tail deer fawn, which was the first animal to be born at BC Wildlife Park. In addition, the Minister of Northern Affairs Arthur Laing, donated to the park three buffalo calves and gave it tax exempt status. Furthermore, due to its popularity, businesses, service clubs, and individuals sponsored various exhibits at BC Wildlife Park, which helped to cover the various operating expenses. However, the park would go through tough financial difficulties for the next five years.

=== Financial difficulties ===
Molson Breweries announced that it would provide an additional 50 acres (200,000 m^{2}) across the highway as a public park with a walkway under the highway and train track around the site of BC Wildlife Park. However, the proposal was later shelved when the BC Wildlife Park ran into financial difficulties and it would need support from the three levels of government for the proposal to go through.

In 1970, the Canadian economy had a downturn that caused both attendance and donations to drop sharply, which created a $7,000 deficit for the park. This caused Moelaert and the board to appeal for financial assistance from the city of Kamloops, the regional district, and the provincial government. However, all three levels of governance decided to support and recognize the value of the park in principle, but will not give out financial assistance.

Shortly afterwards, the board would offer the Thompson-Nicola Regional District the wildlife park and all its assets in exchange for an annual $15,000 grant for five years. The district agreed by holding a money referendum on December 12, 1970. Unfortunately, the referendum failed to reach the minimum 60% voter approval that would potentially force the society to dispose all of its assets and return the land to Molson Breweries due to the stipulation that the land would only be used as a wildlife park, alone.

In desperation, the park board directors was able to receive a loan although, each member had to assume personal liability to keep the park open in 1971. When financial situations remained critical, local service clubs decided to hold a bingo event to raise money to keep the park feasible, but it fell short of its goal.

This caused founder, John Moelaert to resign as the park's manager on August 31, 1971, leaving park president, Doug Jebson as head of the board of directors and with the mandate of keeping the park alive.

After going through three failed attempts of financing and witnessing their founder's resignation, the BC Wildlife Park was saved when the city of Kamloops amalgamated with other nearby municipalities in 1972. Through the merger of boundaries, the BC Wildlife Park were within the city's boundaries and responsibilities to discuss saving the park from closure.

=== Present ===
Since 1972, the BC Wildlife Park has gone through continual changes and enhancements through the support of volunteers and business professionals throughout the province. In 1987, the BC Wildlife Park attained national status when it received accreditation from the Canadian Association of Zoos and Aquariums (CAZA). Today, the Kamloops Wildlife Park Society is governed by a volunteer board of 14 directors, who are elected at the Annual General Meeting from a membership of over 8,000 people.

== Conservation and education projects ==
=== TD Canada Trust Nature Exchange ===
The BC Wildlife Park opened the Nature Exchange in order to teach people about biological and physical components of their environment, through observation, background research and responsible collecting. If people have a natural item they can bring it to the Nature Exchange and get experienced staff to see and discuss the item with the collector on what the object is, where it came from, why it is special and any other details. Collectors are encouraged to further their knowledge of nature through research in the adjacent resource library. Staff can award the exchange based on three criteria:

1. Collector's knowledge of the item and how they share that information with staff
2. What distinguishes the item from other similar items
3. The condition of the item

Through this process, the collector learns that the simplest object can be awarded a high point value, if the collector shows initiative. The process of trading provides the necessary motivation. In searching for things to collect and trade, individuals learn to observe, to ask questions, and to think independently. Points that are awarded based on the three criteria will be placed on the Nature Exchange computer trading data bank, which will be used for future trading for items in the constantly rotating collection of artifacts and other items that collectors can take home to enjoy. Visitors can take the item with them as part of their collection or bring it back to trade it for another item. However, due to federal and provincial regulations, the BC Wildlife Park through the Nature Exchange will raise awareness and emphasize the importance on ethical collecting, on responsible outdoor recreation, and on sustainable living practices. For example, it is unlawful to have British Columbia wildlife as domestic pets or to collect cast off antlers. People will be encouraged to enjoy nature in a sustainable way, and that means that items like bird's nests, flowers or animal bones should be photographed or sketched, but left physically undisturbed for everyone to appreciate. The Nature Exchange will include an Answers & Resources Library and Trading Zone as well as five distinct zones: Animals, Insects, Plants & Trees, Rocks, Minerals & Fossils, and Skulls and Bones.

=== Community stewardship ===
The BC Wildlife Park have a policy to be committed to promoting a sustainable and responsible environmental practices. Through this policy, all new construction at or in association with the park will follow strict environmental standards from the types of materials being used; to the way they heat and light their facilities and how they can reuse recyclable material whenever they can.

In the near future, the BC Wildlife Park would like to showcase and set an example for others through a wide variety of sustainable projects that will include alternate energy practices, such as solar and wind power, waste water treatment in a natural marsh, and recycling projects that will include composting techniques.

=== The Wildlife Rehabilitation Centre ===
The Kamloops Wildlife Park Society operates the only licensed Wildlife Rehabilitation Centre in the Kamloops area. The Wildlife Rehabilitation Centre staff and volunteers work closely with the Ministry of Environment as well as community partners to provide rehabilitation services for injured, ill, or orphaned mammals, birds of prey, amphibians, reptiles and endangered species until they can be returned to their natural habitats.

The Wildlife Rehabilitation Centre also has a partnership with Thompson Rivers University's – Animal Health Technology Program (AHT) to teach and prepare students to become Animal Health Technicians. Students that are taking this program will learn many aspects of their course requirements while providing a very high level of veterinary care and learning their course requirements while participating in animal health and wildlife rehabilitation at the BC Wildlife Park.

In 2006, the Rehabilitation Centre rescued and rehabilitated 139 animals and in 2007, the park took in five rescued rattlesnakes and rehabilitated them by the fall season when the snakes were eventually released to a den site. One of the snakes also gave birth at the park and the surviving young were also released into the wild. In 2008, the Rehabilitation Centre took in 11 deer fawns from Kamloops and other surrounding communities such as Prince George and Kelowna. Two of the fawns did not survive after they were rescued, while one survivor will not be released since it has lost its fear of humans. However, eight of the surviving deer fawns were released into the wild.

=== Burrowing Owl Captive Breeding Program ===
Since 1991, BC Wildlife Park has released well over 500 juvenile burrowing owls back into their British Columbia grassland habitat and is an active member of the Burrowing Owl Conservation Society of British Columbia. As of now, BC Wildlife Park has the largest burrowing owl breeding facility in North America.

Prior to 1980, British Columbia's burrowing owl population had almost been extirpated from the grassland areas of the Thompson-Okanagan region. To prevent the species from going extinct in the British Columbia grasslands, the BC Wildlife Park participated in the British Columbia Burrowing Owl Recovery Program in 1990, with the construction of its first breeding facility.

The main goal of the Breeding Program is to achieve a self-supporting burrowing owl population in British Columbia's grasslands through population increase, habitat improvement, and public education. To increase the population, about 100 owls are born and raised within the breeding facility. After one year, those same owls would then be released into the grasslands of the Thompson-Okanagan area after staff carefully select a proper release site. In terms, of habitat and education, the wildlife park's education department undertakes extensive interpretive programs and field trips that involve schools and other community groups to promote local awareness about the burrowing owls' plight. In addition, the park's burrowing owl ambassador, is very well known in the local community, and will promote the fundamental message that people of all ages can do something to preserve and protect endangered grassland species. Furthermore, the breeding program is a partnership that includes wildlife park staff, volunteers, local landowners, and the British Columbia Ministry of Education, which also helps in delivering its message and objectives.

After twelve years with the program, BC Wildlife Park constructed a new Burrowing Owl Recovery Centre within its grounds in 2002. The new facility is capable of producing over 100 young owls for release each year. The design of the Burrowing Owl Recovery Centre was developed by BC Wildlife Park staff and is currently being copied by other North American facilities due to its success as a leader in Burrowing Owl captive breeding for release according to the National Burrowing Owl Team. In addition, BC Wildlife Park also received an award of excellence for its captive breeding program from the Canadian Association of Zoos and Aquariums in 2004.

== Attractions ==
- Highland Valley Copper Amphitheatre
- Home Hardware Corral
- Wildlife Express - 2 ft (610 mm) narrow gauge railway
- Zippity Zoo Zone Playground & Splash Park
