= Alpenzoo =

Alpenzoo Innsbruck
- Logo of the Alpenzoo Innsbruck

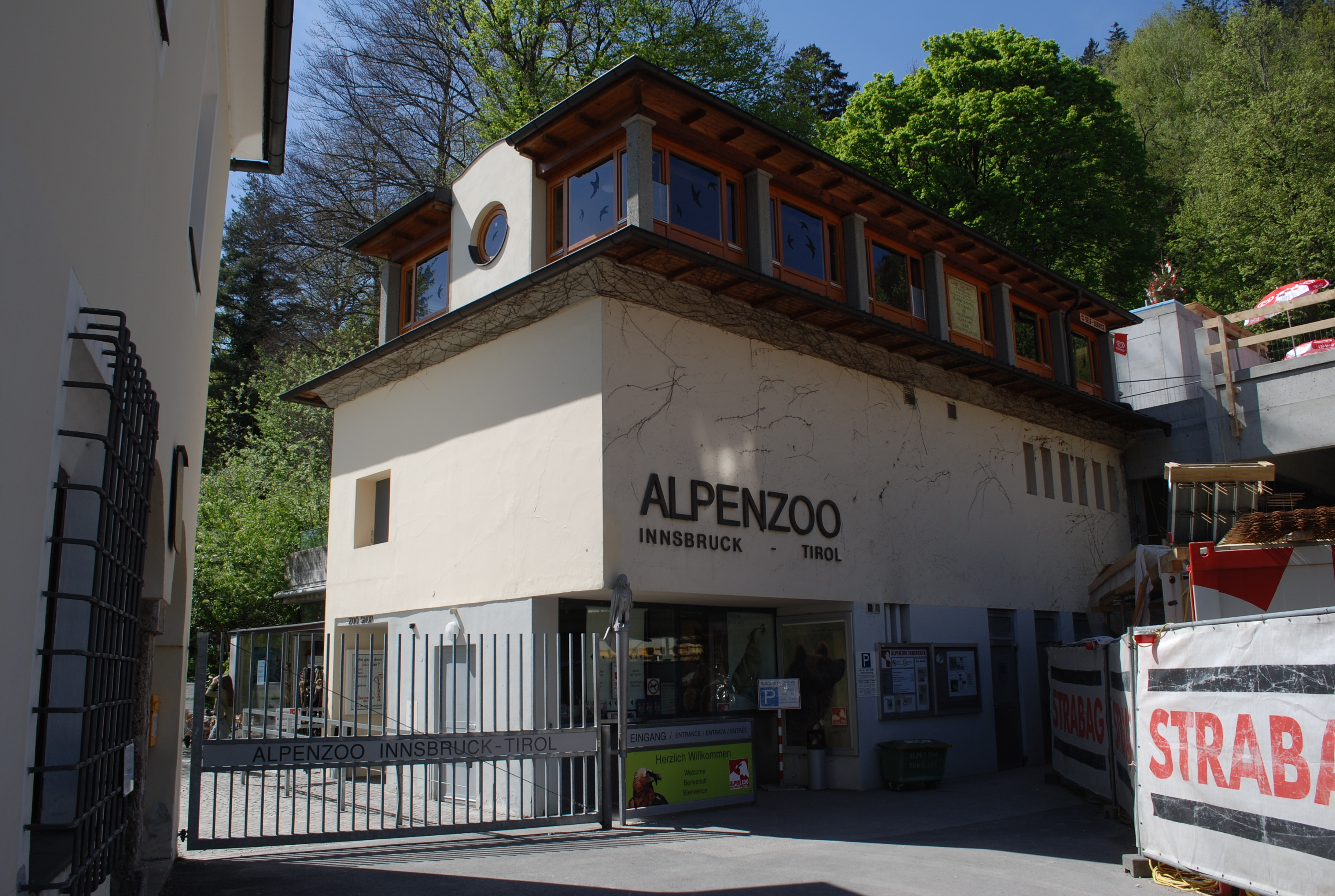
- Alpenzoo Main entrance
- Interactive map of Alpenzoo Innsbruck
- 47°16′50″N 11°23′53″E
- Date opened: 1962
- Location: Weiherburggasse 37, 6020 Innsbruck
- Land area: 5 Hektar
- No. of animals: 2,000
- No. of species: 150
- Website: www.alpenzoo.at

Alpenzoo Innsbruck is a zoo located in the city Innsbruck, in the Austrian state of Tyrol. It is one of the highest elevation zoos in Europe.

== General ==
Founded 22 September 1962 by the Austrian zoologist Hans Psenner, Alpenzoo reintroduced endangered species like the bearded vulture, Alpine ibex, and northern bald ibis in the wild.

The zoo is a non-profit association, and the majority of their funding comes from the entrance fees, but the zoo receives additional funds from the city of Innsbruck and the government of Tyrol. There is also financial participation from the society 'Freunde des Alpenzoo', sponsors and animal adopters.

A new wooden pavilion was inaugurated in August 2017 to provide information on forestry and the wood industry. The pavilion was made in collaboration with proHolz Tyrol and the design of the building was the object of a competition for the students in design and architecture of the area. The pavilion is entirely made in wood and has the form of a snail.

The Alpenzoo was one of the places chosen to represent Austria on the collectible zero Euro bank note. The picture represents three of the zoo's star animals: the bearded vulture, the lynx and the Alpine ibex.

== Species ==
The zoo accommodates about 2000 animals from 150 animal species: 20 mammals (of the 80 mammal species in the Alps), 60 bird species, 11 reptile species and 6 amphibian species, plus almost all the fish species present in the Alps. The Alpenzoo is the only zoo in the world that exhibits the wallcreeper.

Here are a few of the species of birds, mammals, reptiles and amphibians exhibit at the Alpenzoo:

Birds
Bearded vulture
Black grouse
Black stork
Capercaillie
Dipper
Eagle owl
Goldcrest
Golden eagle
Goosander
Hazel grouse
Northern bald ibis
Nutcracker
Passerines
Ptarmigan
Pygmy owl
Raven
Rock partridge
Scops owl
Tengmalm's owl
Ural owl
Wallcreeper

Mammals
Pine marten
Beaver
Brown bear
Alces
Eurasian otter
Roe deer
Wild boar
Chamois
Lynx
Alpine marmot
Snow hare
Alpine ibex
European wildcat
European bison
Wolf
Harvest mouse

Reptiles and amphibians
Grass snake
European pond terrapin
Ocellated lizard
European adder
European tree frog
Common newt
Natterjack toad
Crested newt
Smooth newt
Marsh frog
Yellow-bellied toad
Black salamander

== Exhibits, activities and services on site ==
The zoo is on the slope of a mountain, with lots of footpaths to explore the park and observe the animals.

The main attraction of the zoo are the big Alpine animals: bears, wolves, moose, bison, etc. Birds of prey are also one of the big feature of the zoo, with some species rarely seen in zoos like the northern bald ibises that can be observed in a big aviary that was built specifically to accommodate the endangered birds. There is also the Innergschlöß where many species can be seen, like the bearded vulture. The zoo also has a little show farm to show the diversity of the Alpine livestock. Many species of fowls, sheep, cattle, pigs and goats can be observed and petted. A lot of these breeds are old breeds created to meet the specific requirements of small-scale farming of the many micro-climates of the Alps. There are also six big terrarium created to accommodate the reptiles species of the zoo, and an aqua-terrarium to cater for the amphibians.

With its 17 tanks containing between 80 and 14,000 liters each, the Alpenzoo owns the biggest fresh water aquarium in the world. More than 50 species of Alpine fishes can be observed there, with some of the species being quite rare or endangered. The aquariums recreate many habitats, from a cold Alpine river, a little pond, a lake, or the living conditions of the Danube. The zoo also received international recognition for its breeding program of some rare Alpine fish species.

The Alpenzoo has an educational department that offers experimental teaching with animals for groups of all ages. The professional hire to teach are both teachers and biologists.

Most of the areas are accessible to wheelchair, but some footpaths are quite steep. There are two restaurants on site: the ANIMAHL - Bistro im Zoo, offering daily dishes and a fine selection of beverage, and the Café and Restaurant "Weiherburg", for a more casual experience. Both offer indoor and outdoor seating. There is a both a big playground and a smaller one for little children. There is also a climbing wall that leads to the Eagle Nest and many other playing facilities on the site.

== Conservation, protection of the environment and rehabilitation of species ==
Alpenzoo is the European Endangered Species Programme coordinator of the northern bald ibis, and the only zoo in the world which exhibits the wallcreeper.

- The Alpenzoo participates in a project to monitor salamanders in Austria, notably the Alpine salamander present in Tyrol. The number of amphibians is rapidly decreasing in Austria for a number of reasons, including the presence of a fungus that attacks the salamanders.
- Wildkatze Österreich
  The zoo participates in the Wildcat Platforme, a co-operation between many Austrian organisations to promote and protect wildcats in Austria through research and the protection of territories.
- The Alpine Bearded Vulture Project
  In 1974, Alpenzoo was the first institution to succeed in breading the bearded vulture ex-situ in the Alps. The zoos started the first breeding plan in a volary in 1970 with reintroduction as the ultimate goal. In 1978, an international organisation was created to advance the project and many breeding facilities were created in the world. In 1987, the first couple was released in an artificial nest in the Alps.
- Scharnstein Waldrapp Project
  In 2002, the zoo participated in the breeding of eleven Waldrapp ibis in order to re-introduce to species through immigration. The ibis were hand-raised before being trained to follow a microflight to prepare for their migration. The project was considered a scientific success in 2005, with a small population of birds migrating.
- Reintroducing ibexes into the Eastern Alps
  The Alpenzoo was instrumental in the reinsertion and the introduction of the Alpine ibex in the Eastern Alps. The population in Austria is now 3,200 and is deemed stable. The Alpenzoo helped in the reintroduction of approximately 260 animals in the 30 last years. The banding of new animals released in the area is also made in the park.
- The zoo has a veterinary infirmary for sick or injured animals of Tyrol, notably birds of prey.
