= Canada's Accredited Zoos and Aquariums =

Canadian accreditation and advocacy organization

- Abbreviation: CAZA, AZAC
- Formation: 1975; 51 years ago
- Type: National not-for-profit organization
- Purpose: Zoo and aquarium accreditation and advocacy
- Headquarters: Ottawa, Ontario, Canada
- Region served: Canada
- Method: Accreditation
- Parent organization: World Association of Zoos and Aquariums
- Website: http://www.caza.ca
- Formerly called: Canadian Association of Zoological Parks and Aquariums, Canadian Association of Zoos and Aquariums

Canada's Accredited Zoos and Aquariums (CAZA; French: Aquariums et Zoos Accrédités du Canada (AZAC)) is an accreditation and advocacy organization representing zoos and aquariums within Canada. The organization states that its member zoos and aquariums care for more than 100,000 individual animals representing over 2000 species of wildlife, observed by an estimated 11 million visitors each year. The organization is a member of the International Union for Conservation of Nature and the World Association of Zoos and Aquariums.

== Founding ==
The organization was founded in 1975 at a conference of the Association of Zoos and Aquariums (then named the American Association of Zoological Parks and Aquariums).

== Name changes ==
The organization's original name was Canadian Association of Zoological Parks and Aquariums - L'Association Canadienne des Jardins Zoologiques et des Aquariums. In 1997 the name was changed to the Canadian Association of Zoos and Aquariums – L'Association des Zoos et Aquariums du Canada. In 2012, the name was changed again to its current name, Canada's Accredited Zoos and Aquariums - Aquariums et Zoos Accrédités du Canada (CAZA-AZAC).

== Accreditation program ==
CAZA-AZAC's main vehicle is its accreditation program. Standards of conduct are set out for animal care, animal transport, human and animal contact; as well as operational matters such as staffing, physical facilities, and emergency preparation. Inspection teams, including at least one veterinarian and a senior zoology professional, audit all aspects of the operation of the potential member.

Members must agree to a Code of Ethics. Included in the Code is agreeing to "Ensure that when animals are obtained from the wild, that such acquisitions will not have a deleterious effect upon the wild population and are acquired incorporating all legal and ethical approval methods and documentation." Further, mutilation of any animal for a cosmetic purpose or changing the animal's physical appearance without valid husbandry or medical reasons is also not permitted.

Full re-inspections of members' facilities are made every five years. If, during that period, a concern is raised about any aspect of a member institution, the Accreditation Commission or Ethics Committee may conduct an interim review.

== Conservation ==
The organization states that member organizations have a long history of working to restore biodiversity and preserve species in Canada and abroad, collaborating regularly with government agencies, NGO's and volunteer organizations with those aims. Members "participate in close to 800 conservation and science programs within their facilities and are directly involved in 20 field projects, most linked directly to helping save endangered species."

The organization's Canadian Endangered Species Program (CESP) offers long-term breeding and conservation plans to aid selected Canadian endangered species, including the Vancouver Island marmot, burrowing owl, spotted owl, loggerhead shrike, wolverine, black-footed ferret, whooping crane, and the Oregon spotted frog. In 2012, it was reported that since the burrowing owl recovery efforts began in British Columbia in 1992, over 1,244 captive bred owls had been released and over 700 artificial burrows had been established. These efforts involved the Burrowing Owl Conservation Society, the British Columbia Wildlife Park and more recently the Calgary Zoo.

== Advocacy ==
In 2013, the organization advocated for more stringent provincial rules on exotic animals and the licensing of zoos and aquariums, raising their concerns at a meeting of the Atlantic Canada Mayor's Congress. Former Executive Director Massimo Bergamini stated: "The mayors know first hand the public safety, animal welfare and environmental issues that can arise when exotic animals are not properly cared for; just as they know that municipal governments do not have the legislative authority or the inspection and enforcement resources adequate to the task". The mayors adopted a resolution supporting CAZA's position and intended to raise it with the Federation of Canadian Municipalities and their provincial governments.

In May 2014, the Federation of Canadian Municipalities' members passed an emergency resolution from the Atlantic Mayors' Congress on the same issue. The resolution called on "the federal government to play a leadership role in forging a pan-Canadian approach to exotic animal regulation" and supported "the efforts of Canada's Accredited Zoos and Aquariums (CAZA) for more stringent rules on exotic animals and the licensing of zoos and aquariums." The Atlantic mayors pushed for the resolution in response to a tragedy in August 2013, when two Campbellton, New Brunswick boys lost their lives after they were asphyxiated in their sleep by an African rock python.

== Publications ==
The organization's website sets out policies and position statements on a number of issues, such as the limited use of wild or exotic animals for performances, and around the issue of captive dolphins and whales.

== Controversy ==
=== Captive marine mammals ===
Zoos and aquariums are under increasing public pressure to stop keeping captive marine mammals and other wildlife. Humane Society International states that inhumane whale and dolphin captures take place routinely around the world, resulting in many deaths; marine mammals in captivity have a history of premature deaths; and captive enclosures cannot simulate the complexity of the ocean and coasts. CAZA does not appear to have issued a new policy on the maintenance and display of whales and dolphins since 2008.

=== Marineland quality of care ===
One of CAZA's accredited members, Marineland of Canada, was under intense public pressure for its treatment of animals. CAZA investigated after receiving complaints, finding that "the marine mammals were in overall good health and there was no evidence of animal abuse, that water quality in all the pools was very good, and it appeared that staffing levels were adequate"; although examining records and interviewing ex-employees raised questions about how effectively the water quality systems in some pools were working. MarineLand agreed to undertake an engineering study of its water quality systems, and in the interim, MarineLand agreed to unannounced inspections. At the same time, the Ontario Society for the Prevention of Cruelty to Animals did their own investigation of both the marine and land animals, raising "some areas of concern where certain deficiencies exist" and later issued six orders, which MarineLand completed by April 2013.

The organization Zoocheck Canada criticized CAZA's findings, stating they showed "just how ineffective the organization is and how remarkably low their standards are. Did their inspectors not notice the complete social isolation of Kiska the killer whale, the utterly barren enclosures for both aquatic and terrestrial animals, the complete absence of enrichment, the near permanent sequestering of some pinnipeds in small indoor cages, the still inappropriate bear enclosure, the uncontrolled public feeding, etc., etc.. And CAZA says nothing about the fact that Marineland has an absurd number (nearly 40 at last count) of beluga whales, most of them wild caught. Even if you believe it's acceptable to keep whales in captivity, what facility needs that many."

Protests of conditions at Marineland of Canada continue, with a demonstration on May 17, 2014, when the park opened for the season.

Marineland closed in 2024. Its wildlife were still in the process of being relocated to other facilities in 2026.

== See also ==
- List of CAZA member zoos and aquariums
- List of zoo associations
- Association of Zoos and Aquariums
- World Association of Zoos and Aquariums
