= International Zoo Educators Association =

- Abbreviation: IZE
- Formation: 6 September 1972
- Legal status: Non-profit
- Purpose: Education
- Headquarters: Sausalito, California, United States
- Region served: Worldwide
- Members: Zoos and Aquariums
- Affiliations: WAZA
- Website: izea.net

The International Zoo Educators Association (IZE) is a non-profit organization dedicated to improving the education programmes in zoos and aquariums.

Founded in 1972 by a group of European zoo educators, IZE's aim was to create a forum where zoo educators could meet every two years to discuss and share ideas and common interests. The founding members included those from Frankfurt Zoo, Amsterdam Zoo, Paignton Zoo and Copenhagen Zoo.
The first IZE President was Rosl Kirchshofer, head of education at the Frankfurt Zoo.

Proceedings were produced for the first time at the second international meeting in 1974 at Copenhagen Zoo. To facilitate communication among members the first newsletter was produced in 1977, edited by Jan Hatley, head of education at Paignton Zoo.

The IZE website states that the association's mission is to:

"[...expand] the educational impact of zoos and aquariums worldwide", "improve the education programs" and "support excellence in animal care and welfare".

== History ==
The International Zoo Educators Association was established after a meeting of zoo education officers held in Frankfurt, Germany on September 6, 1972.

=== Newsgroup ===
In November 1999 a group of IZE European members began a European regional internet discussion group to help educators network between conferences. This group started life as the ERNIZE (Note: ERNIZE - the European Regional Network of IZE - was established as a means of structuring communications between European zoo educators who, it was felt, had little opportunity to do so in between conferences.) Yahoo Group managed by staff at Chester Zoo in England, UK. In June 2007 the IZE Board voted to make the group international and available to IZE members worldwide. The name changed to the IZE Yahoo Group and its management transferred to Edinburgh Zoo in Scotland. Membership of the group is by invitation-only and its primary purpose is ‘to enable discussion, exchange of information and questions etc. between zoo educators across the world’.

=== Institutional membership and sponsored delegates ===
IZE offers institutional membership to zoos, aquariums, nature/wildlife centres and wildlife reserves. At least 50% of this annual membership fee is used in a scheme to enable sponsored delegates to attend conferences when they might not otherwise be able to afford to, and supports outreach to zoo and wildlife educators in the developing world.

Sponsored delegates must be qualified to seek full membership and be unable to pay regular membership fees. Sponsored membership applications must be approved by the Regional Representatives and IZE President. Approved members are entitled to all rights and privileges of full membership for two years.

=== Relationship with WAZA ===
Every year since 2000, IZE has reported to the World Association of Zoos and Aquariums about their achievements to realize the education goals formulated in the World Zoo and Aquarium Conservation Strategy.

In 2002 IZE became an affiliate member of WAZA.

In 2004 an IZE Central Office was established after a proposal to WAZA for assistance. It was decided during the 2004 WAZA Conference in Taipei, Taiwan to offer room, equipment and a one-day a week staff member in their headquarters at this time in Bern, Switzerland, giving IZE a stable base for all kinds of activities. This also increased the efficiency of the management of IZE membership dues, allowing more sponsored delegates to attend the IZE Conferences. Since 2009, IZE has made a contribution towards the running costs of the headquarters.

Under a MoU, the WAZA's Executive Office provides secretariat support to the IZE. In 2010, the Association separated from the WAZA office in order to better serve their members. The IZE Administrator position is a paid position and is now selected and works for the IZE President and in support of the President on all matters for the Association specifically membership, tracking financial statements and note keeping on Board communications. The Association now manages its own membership and membership dues in an extremely efficient manner and continues to make the IZE Journal and IZE Grants Program a priority of funding.

=== Formalisation of Statutes under Swiss law in 2006 ===
Under the name "International Zoo Educators Association" (IZE) exists, for an indefinite period of time, an association under the terms of articles 60 to 78 of the Swiss Civil Code. The association is a non-profit organization with international membership. The association office is located in Bern, Switzerland.

The IZE Constitution was adopted and put into force by the General Assembly at the 18th Biennal Conference in Pretoria, South Africa on 13 October 2006. It is revised annually and proposed changes are voted on by the General Assembly during the IZE Conferences.

=== Website ===
The IZE's website was first launched in 2001 with a major overhaul taking place in 2005.

== Journals ==
The first Newsletter of the International Association of Zoo Educators was produced after the third conference in 1976. It was edited by Jan Hatley, head of education at Paignton Zoo, and published in 1977. The aim of the newsletter was to facilitate communication among members between conferences.

The newsletter was redesigned and edited for economic reasons with the help of Judith White and Judith King of the National Zoo in Washington, D.C., and the sixth issue was published in 1981.

In 1986 the newsletter became the Journal of the International Association of Zoo Educators as suggested by Judith King:

To most people, the word ‘newsletter’ implies a brief publication containing job announcements, personnel moves, short program notices, births, etc. What a newsletter does not contain is professional articles like those found in journals. It appears to me that IZE’s Newsletter is more of a journal than a newsletter.

— Judith King, White-Marcellini, J., 1986, ‘From the President’, Journal of the International Association of Zoo Educators, 15, p. 2

The Journal describes itself as a resource for articles on conservation, interpretation, zoo education, methods and techniques, and evaluation. Its publication has been annual since 1999.

=== List of journals ===
Issue no.	Year	Editor	Zoo
1	1977	Jan Hatley	Paignton Zoological and Botanical Gardens
2	1978	Jan Hatley	Paignton Zoological and Botanical Gardens
3	1978	Jan Hatley	Paignton Zoological and Botanical Gardens
4	1979	Jan Hatley	Paignton Zoological and Botanical Gardens
5	1980	Jan Hatley	Paignton Zoological and Botanical Gardens
6	1981	Judith White; Judith King	National Zoological Park
7	1981	Judith White; Judith King	National Zoological Park
8	1982	Judith White; Judith King	National Zoological Park
9	1982	Judith White; Judith King	National Zoological Park
10	1983	Judith White; Judith King	National Zoological Park
11	1983	Judith White; Judith King	National Zoological Park
12	1984	Judith White; Judith King	National Zoological Park
13	1984	Judith White	National Zoological Park
14	1985	Pegi S. Harvey	Zoological Society of San Diego
15	1986	Helen Freeman	Woodland Park Zoo
16	1986	Malcolm Whitehead	Twycross Zoo
17	1987	Judith King	National Zoological Park
18	1987	Pegi Harvey	Zoological Society of San Diego
19	1988	Stephen McAuley	Taronga Zoo
20	1988	Malcolm P. Whitehead	Twycross Zoo
21	1989	Judith King	National Zoological Park
22	1989	Janet Jackson	Philadelphia Zoological Gardens
23	1990	Stephen McAuley	Taronga Zoo
24	1990	Juliane Seger	Dortmund Zoo
25	1992	Phillip Coffey	Jersey Wildlife Preservation Trust
26	1992	Christopher Cheng	Taronga Zoo
27	1993	Stephen McAuley	Taronga Zoo
28	1993	Stephen McAuley; Juliane Seger	Taronga Zoo Dortmund Zoo
29	1993	Stephen McAuley; Christopher Cheng	Taronga Zoo
30	1994	Stephen McAuley; Kim Stiles	Taronga Zoo Wildfowl and Wetlands Trust
31	1995	Stephen McAuley	Taronga Zoo
32	1995	Stephen McAuley	Taronga Zoo
33	1996	Stephen McAuley	Taronga Zoo
34	1997	Greg Hunt	Melbourne Zoo
35	1999	Robert Mindick	SeaWorld Orlando
36	2000	Robert Mindick	SeaWorld Orlando
37	2001	Robert Mindick	SeaWorld Orlando
38	2002	Stephen McKeown	Chester Zoo
39	2003	Stephen McKeown	Chester Zoo
40	2004	Stephen McKeown	Chester Zoo
41	2005	Martin Serafini	Edinburgh Zoo
42	2006	Natasha Silva	Royal Zoo Amsterdam
43	2007	Natasha Silva	Royal Zoo Amsterdam
44	2008	Natasha Silva	Royal Zoo Amsterdam
45	2009	Natasha Silva	Royal Zoo Amsterdam
46	2010	Natasha Silva	Royal Zoo Amsterdam

== List of conferences ==
Number	Date	Host	Host location
1	September 6, 1972	Frankfurt Zoo	Frankfurt, Germany
2	1974	Copenhagen Zoo	Copenhagen, Denmark
3	June 1976	London Zoo	London, England, UK
4	September 26–29, 1978	National Zoological Park	Washington D.C., United States
5	September 30 - October 3, 1980	Tiergarten Schoenbrunn	Vienna, Austria
6	September 25–29, 1982	Arizona-Sonora Desert Museum	Tucson, Arizona, United States
7	September 2–6, 1984	Edinburgh Zoo and Peebles Hotel Hydro	Edinburgh, Scotland, UK
8	October 26–31, 1986	Melbourne Zoo	Melbourne, Australia
9	October 2–7, 1988	Metro Toronto Zoo	Toronto, Ontario, Canada
10	September 9–15, 1990	Antwerp Zoo	Antwerp, Belgium
11	August 23–28, 1992	Taronga Zoo	Mosman, Sydney, Australia
12	September 25–30, 1994	Los Angeles Zoo	Los Angeles, California, United States
13	1996	Copenhagen Zoo	Copenhagen, Denmark
14	1998	Taipei Zoo	Taipei, Taiwan
15	October 1–6, 2000	Guadalajara Zoo	Guadalajara, Jalisco, Mexico
16	August 17–22, 2002	Tiergarten Schoenbrunn	Vienna, Austria
17	September 4–9, 2004	Ocean Park	Hong Kong
18	October 9–14, 2006	National Zoological Gardens of South Africa	Pretoria, South Africa
19	October 19–23, 2008	Adelaide Zoo	Adelaide, Australia
20	September 28 - October 2, 2010	Disney's Animal Kingdom	Lake Buena Vista, Florida, United States
21	August 28 - September 1, 2012	Chester Zoo	Chester, England, UK
22	September 2–6, 2014	Ocean Park Hong Kong	Hong Kong
23	September 18–22, 2016	Temaiken Foundation	Buenos Aires, Argentina
24	September 14–18, 2018	Al Ain Zoo	Al Ain, UAE
25	October 11–15, 2020	San Diego Zoo	San Diego, California, United States
26	2022	Wellington Zoo	Wellington, New Zealand

== List of presidents ==
1. Rosl Kirchshofer (Frankfurt Zoo, Germany; 1972 - 1976)
2. Han Rensenbrink (Amsterdam Zoo, Netherlands; 1976 - 1980)
3. Jan Hatley (Paignton Zoo, England; 1980 - 1984)
4. Judith White (National Zoo, United States; 1984 - 1988)
5. Lars Lunding Andersen (Copenhagen Zoo, Denmark; 1988 - 1992)
6. Robert Ollason (Edinburgh Zoo, Scotland; 1992 - 1996)
7. Pegi Harvey (San Diego Zoo, United States; 1996 - 2000)
8. Annette Berkovits (Bronx Zoo, United States; 2000 - 2004)
9. Chris Peters (Rotterdam Zoo, The Netherlands; 2004 - 2006)
10. Stephen McKeown (Chester Zoo, England; 2006 - October 2010)
11. Kathy Lehnhardt (Disney's Animal Kingdom, United States; October 2010 - 2012)
12. Rachel Lowry (Zoos Victoria, Australia; 2013-2016)
13. Isabel Li (Ocean Park, Hong Kong; 2016 - 2018)
14. Debra Erickson (San Diego Zoo Global, USA; 2018–present day)

== See also ==
- List of zoo associations
