= South Asian Zoo Association for Regional Cooperation =

- Founded: August 4, 2000
- Type: Regional not-for-profit organization
- Origins: ZOO
- Region served: South Asia
- Website: www.zooreach.org

The South Asian Zoo Association for Regional Cooperation (SAZARC) is an organization for South Asian zoos and aquariums. SAZARC was established on August 4, 2000, at the first meeting of South Asian Zoos, held at Central Zoo, Kathmandu, Nepal, initiated by the Zoo Outreach Organisation (ZOO). It became a member of the World Association of Zoos and Aquariums (WAZA) in 2004, and membership was terminated by WAZA in 2015. SAZARC is considered the sister organization of the South East Asian Zoos Association (SEAZA), the only other regional association of zoos in Asia.

== Conferences ==
The following table lists the year and venue of all annual conferences of SAZARC.

Session	Started	Ended	Host	Location	Additional notes
First Annual Conference	August 3, 2000	August 3, 2000	Central Zoo	Kathmandu, Nepal	Founding members were Bangladesh, India, Nepal, Pakistan and Sri Lanka.
Second Annual Conference	October 7, 2001	October 11, 2001	Taiping Zoo	Perak, Malaysia	Combined meeting with SEAZA. 10th anniversary of SEAZA.
Third Annual Conference	October 6, 2002	October 11, 2002	Dhaka Zoo	Dhaka, Bangladesh	
Fourth Annual Conference	December 1, 2003	December 5, 2003	Colombo Zoo	Dehiwala, Sri Lanka	
Fifth Annual Conference	December 1, 2004	December 5, 2004	Lahore Zoo	Lahore, Pakistan	First time participation of Afghanistan. SAZARC became a member of WAZA.
Sixth Annual Conference	December 1, 2005	December 5, 2005	Karl Kübel Institute	Coimbatore, India	
Seventh Annual Conference	September 11, 2006	September 13, 2006	Saigon Zoo	Ho Chi Minh City, Vietnam	Combined meeting with SEAZA. 15th anniversary of SEAZA.
Eighth Annual Conference	January 30, 2008	February 3, 2008	Kamla Nehru Zoo	Ahmedabad, India	
Ninth Annual Conference	February 11, 2009	February 15, 2009	Colombo Zoo	Dehiwala, Sri Lanka	10th anniversary of SAZARC.
Tenth Annual Conference	November 22, 2010	November 27, 2010	Central Zoo	Kathmandu, Nepal	First time participation of Bhutan.

== Members ==
The other logo of SAZARC

Founding members

- Bangladesh
- India
- Nepal
- Pakistan
- Sri Lanka

Other members

- Afghanistan (member since 2004)
- Bhutan (member since 2010)
- Maldives

== See also ==
- List of zoo associations
