= National Zoo of Malaysia =

Zoo in Gombak, Selangor, Malaysia

Coordinates: 3°12′35″N 101°45′28″E

National Zoo Zoo Negara
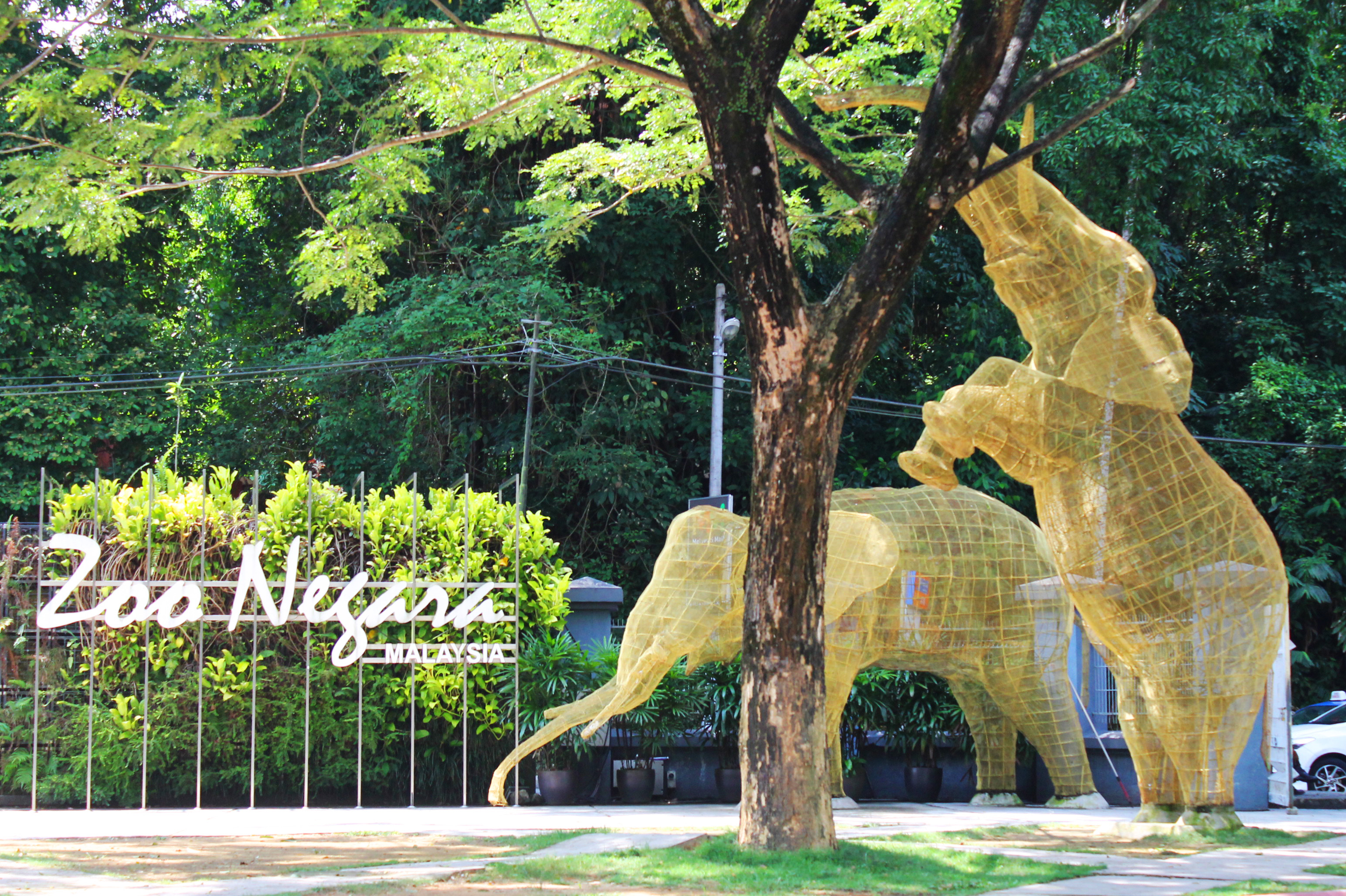
- A monument at Zoo Negara
- Interactive map of National Zoo; Zoo Negara
- Date opened: 14 November 1963; 62 years ago
- Location: Ulu Klang, Gombak, Selangor, Malaysia
- Land area: 110 acres (45 ha)
- No. of animals: 5137
- No. of species: 476
- Memberships: ISO 9001:2008, SEAZA
- Major exhibits: 16 major exhibits
- Website: www.zoonegara.my

The National Zoo (Malay: Zoo Negara) is a Malaysian zoo located on 110 acres (45 ha) of land in Ulu Klang, Gombak District, Selangor, Malaysia. It was officially opened on November 14, 1963, by the country's first prime minister, Tunku Abdul Rahman. The zoo is managed by a non-governmental organization known as the Malaysian Zoological Society and is home to 3,072 animals of 327 different species. It received MS ISO 9001:2008 certification in July 2007 and is a member of the South East Asian Zoos Association (SEAZA). The president and chairman of the zoo is Y. Bhg. Dato' Ismail Hutson.

== History ==
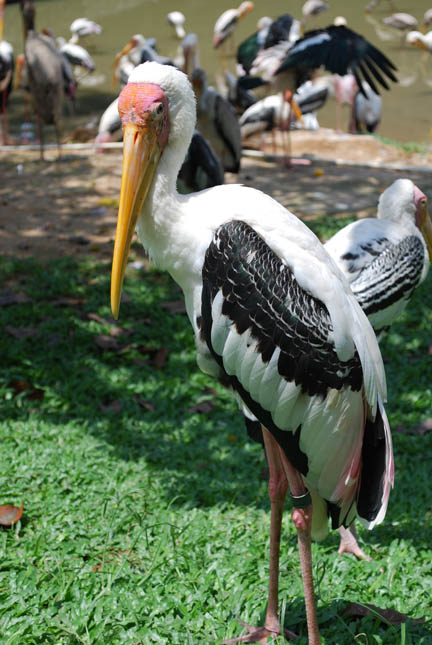
Milky stork

In 1957, the Malayan Agri-Horticultural Association (MAHA) opened a miniature zoo. After the creation of the miniature zoo, the idea of a proper zoo gradually gained momentum, and the federal government chose a spot in Ulu Klang, Selangor, close to the border with Kuala Lumpur. In the 1960s, Ulu Klang was an undeveloped green area. In 1963, the first prime minister of Malaya (now Malaysia), Yang Teramat Mulia (YTM) Tunku Abdul Rahman, opened the zoo to the public. Zoo Negara was known as the "Zoo in the Jungle", due to the lush vegetation that dominated the region.

The zoo welcomed its millionth visitor on 14 November 1966, just three years after opening, and by 1986, the zoo was attracting over one million visitors per year.

The zoo remained surrounded by dense tropical forests until the late 1970s, when Kuala Lumpur experienced rapid population growth fueled by an economic boom. Nearby Ulu Klang was targeted for large-scale residential development to accommodate the expanding urban population such as Taman Melawati, resulting in habitat loss in formerly wild areas surrounding the zoo.

In the late 1990s and early 2000s, there were plans to move the zoo to other locations in Selangor. However, these plans were largely unpopular among the public, as they were seen as an effort by some developers to capitalize on the value of the zoo's large land. With support from the Ministry of Natural Resources and Environment and the Government of Selangor, it was decided not to relocate the zoo.

== Exhibits ==
There are 16 exhibits in the zoo.

Reptile Park

The Reptile Park has both indoor and outdoor exhibits and houses saltwater crocodiles, spectacled caimans, african dwarf crocodiles, false gharials, and cuvier's dwarf caimans. It also exhibits tortoises and terrapins, including Aldabra giant tortoises (the second largest tortoise species in the world) and local Tutong or river terrapins. Snakes in the collection include sailfin lizards, pit vipers, boa constrictors, dog-toothed cat snakes, reticulated pythons, argentine black and white tegus, clouded monitors, king cobras, asian water monitors, reticulated pythons, and many venomous and non-venomous snakes.

The Amphibian World Center at the Reptile Park has a variety of frogs and toads that originate from various habitats in Malaysia.

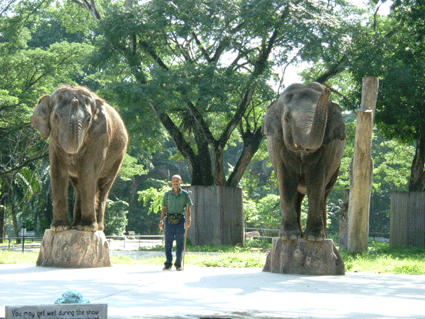
Asian elephants

Giant Panda Conservation Centre

In 2014, a male and female giant panda pair named Xing Xing and Liang Liang went on public display at an air-conditioned, purpose-built Giant Panda Conservation Centre next to tram stop T5. The pandas are on a 10-year loan to Malaysia. On 26 May 2018, Yi Yi, a four-month-old female panda, went on show for the first time. The cub is the second born in Malaysia. The cub's sister, Nuan Nuan, was born in August 2015 and sent back to China in 2017 as part of Beijing's agreement with Malaysia that any cubs born in captivity must be sent back to China at the age of two. A third giant panda cub was born at Malaysia Zoo in June 2021.

Malaysian Elephants

The zoo is home to three Asian elephants – Siti (a female born in 1979 in Fraser's Hill), Sibol (a female born in 1978 at Temerloh), and Teriang (a male born in 1980 in Teriang, after which he is named). The trio have been at the zoo since they were very young.

Lake Birds

The Lake Birds exhibit houses black-headed ibis, storm's storks, ibises, egrets, swans and pelicans.

Bird Aviary

This aviary holds over a hundred bird species from all over the world. The Birds Photo Corner in the aviary lets visitors take souvenir photos with a variety of macaws and cockatoos on weekends.

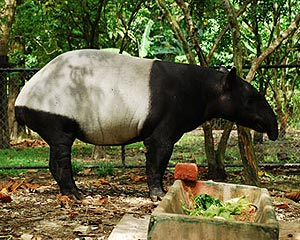
Malayan tapir

Nocturnal Exhibits

These indoor exhibits are home to fruit bats, the largest bat in the world, and sometimes called flying foxes, as well as mouse deer.

Australian Plain

The Australian Plain is home to emus, agile wallabies, and dusky pademelons.

Humboldt Penguins

This exhibit is home to Humboldt penguins.

Children's World

Children's World houses a variety of mostly domestic animals including goats, rabbits, ducks, and chickens roaming around freely, as well as parrots and guinea pigs. It includes a miniature rainforest with a variety of plants and insects, as well as a small aviary, fishpond, miniature horse barn, and playground.

Bear Complex

The Bear Complex is home to several bear species, including Asian black bears, brown bears and sun bears.

Savannah Walk

The Savannah Walk is one of the largest open concepts exhibits in the zoo, and is home to giraffes, plains zebras, helmeted guineafowl, ostriches, Southern white rhinoceroses, african spoonbills, sable antelopes, red lechwes and scimitar-horned oryxes.

Nile Hippopotamus

This exhibit is home to hippopotamuses and pygmy hippopotamuses. The zoo has three Nile hippos – Duke, Kibu, and Chombie. Chombie was born at the zoo.

Mammal Kingdom

The Mammal Kingdom exhibit houses Indian leopards, pumas, leopard cats, masked palm civets, pygmy slow lorises, raccoons, servals, striped hyenas, binturongs malayan peacock-pheasants, and Malayan porcupines.

Freshwater Aquaria

Zoo Negara's Tunku Abdul Rahman Aquarium is the first ecologically based freshwater aquarium that highlights Malaysian rivers and wetlands. The aquarium exhibits showcase the ecosystem or the habitats of Malaysian river systems in the upper, middle and lower estuarine zones, and finally, the sea. The aquarium features fish that are commonly seen in Malaysian rivers, as well as invertebrates such as crabs, shrimps, corals, and aquatic insects.

Cat Walk

The Cat Walk is home to Asiatic lions, leopards, cheetahs, Malayan tigers and white tigers.

Ape Centre

The Ape Centre is home to Bornean and Sumatran orangutans, siamang gibbons, northern white-cheeked gibbons and chimpanzees.

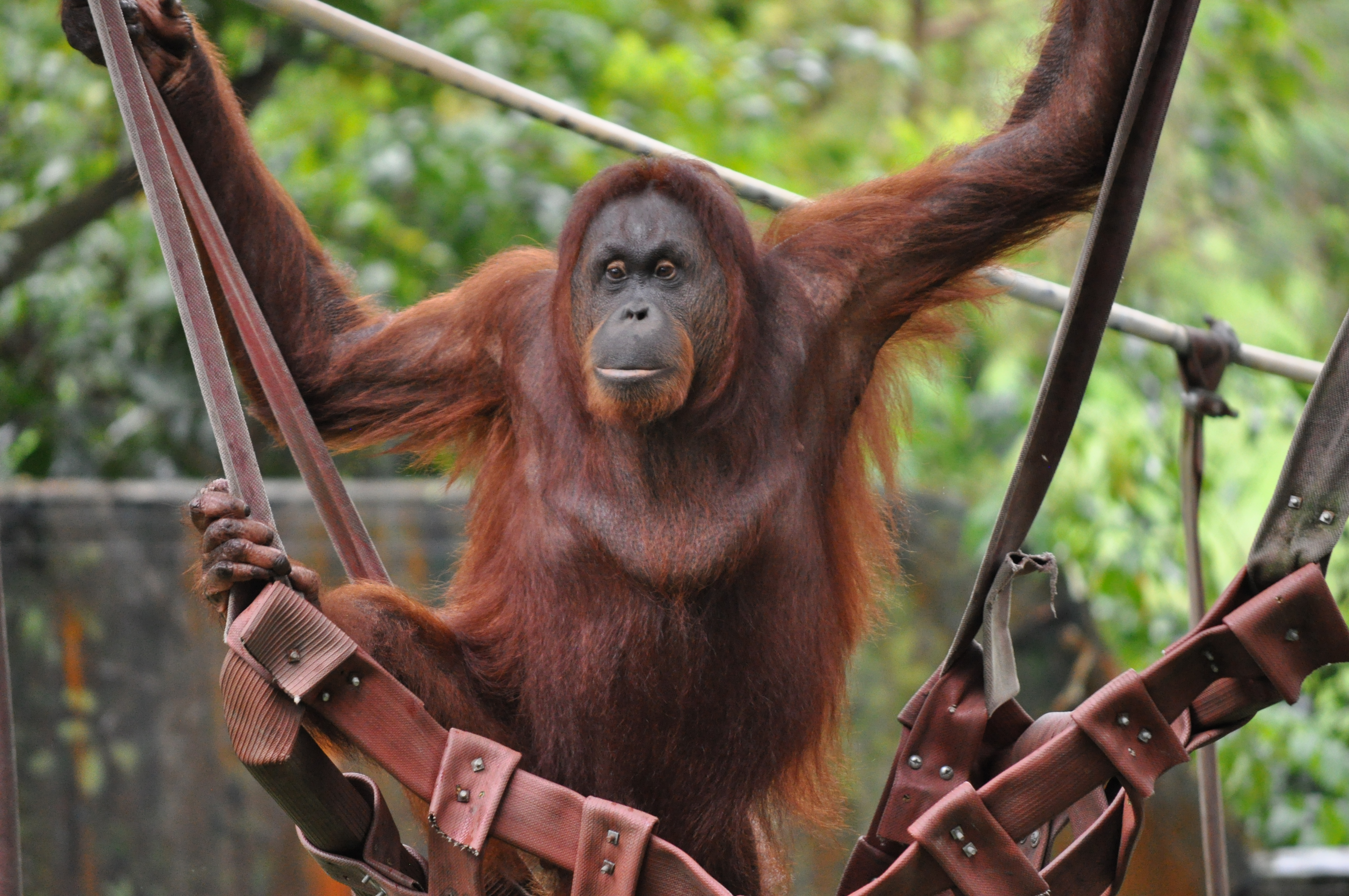
Orangutan

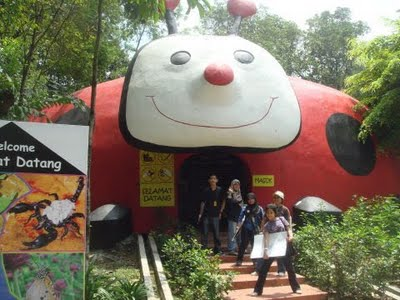
Entrance to the Insect Zoo

Insect Zoo

Zoo Negara also has an insect zoo where more than 200 species of insect from around the world are housed.

Among the insects on display at the zoo are butterflies such as Rajah Brooke's birdwings, tree nymphs and Indian leafwings, as well as orchid and dead leaf mantises, man-faced stink bugs, tarantulas, Malaysian giant scorpions and many more.

Hornbill Centre

Opened in 2010, this breeding centre houses seven species of hornbill native to Malaysia, including great hornbills, Oriental pied hornbills, rhinoceros hornbills, white-crowned hornbills, black kite, brahminy kite wrinkled hornbills.

Other animals

Other animals in the zoo's collection include Ankole cattle, Asian small-clawed otters, cape porcupines, african crested porcupines, asiatic brush-tailed porcupines, bonnet macaques, ruffed lemurs, ring-tailed lemurs, himalayan griffon vultures, white-bellied sea eagles, asian water buffalos, axis deer, banteng, swamp deer, Cape fur seals, capybaras, nyalas, dromedary camels, maras, asian palm civets, gaur, greater flamingos, caribbean flamingos, lion-tailed macaques, red-capped mangabeys, Malayan tapirs and sambar deer.

== Other attractions ==
- Sea lions, macaques and macaws are part of a multi-animal show that is shown twice daily.
- Train rides and guided tours are available on weekends.
- The Mini Bee Museum is located at the heart of Zoo Negara and helps educate visitors about the many types of bees in the country. Honey is also available for sale.
- The Multi-Animal Photo Corner, open on weekends, is located by the zoo's main entrance. Visitors can have their pictures taken with snakes, miniature horses, and birds.

== Conservation ==
Zoo Negara has bred over 200 highly endangered milky storks. The zoo is currently working with the local Wildlife Department on a release program for these birds. Other breeding achievements include hornbills and false gharials.

== Accessiblity ==
There are two options to get there. This zoo is located adjacent to the Kuala Lumpur Middle Ring Road 2 (MRR2), with its entrance near the Taman Melawati intersection. The nearest LRT station is the Wangsa Maju station, which can be accessed by buses that pass through the zoo's entrance area.
