= Zlín-Lešná Zoo =

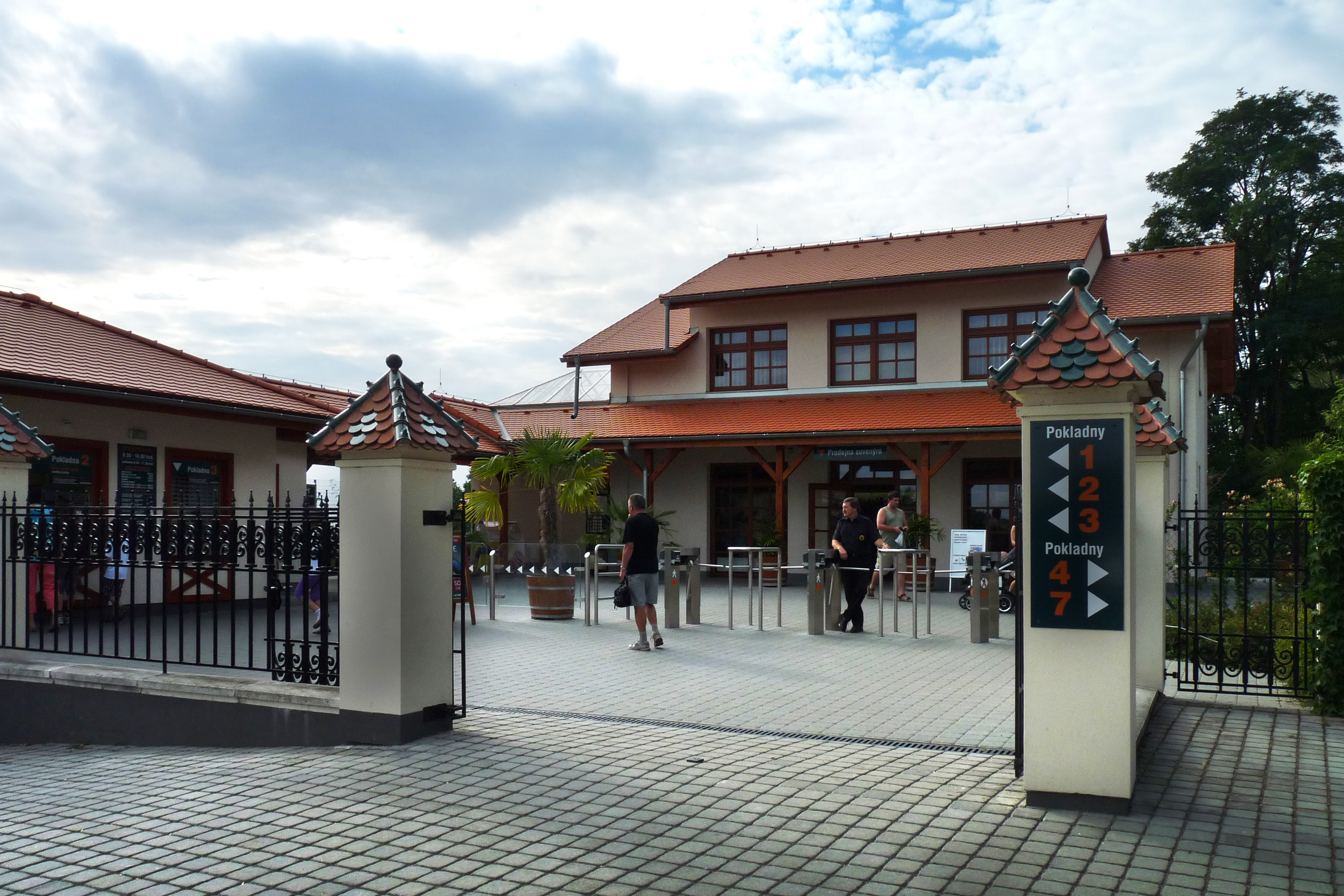
- Main entrance
- Interactive map of Zlín-Lešná Zoo
- 49°16′20″N 17°42′54″E
- Date opened: 1948
- Location: Lukovská 112, 763 14 Zlín 12
- Land area: 48 hectares
- No. of animals: 1,163
- No. of species: 205
- Memberships: UCSZ, EEP, EAZA, WAZA, SEAZA
- Website: http://www.zoozlin.eu

Zlín Zoo (Zoologická zahrada Zlín) is a zoological garden in Zlín in the Zlín Region of the Czech Republic. It is located by the Lešná Castle, situated about 10 km from the centre of the city. In 2011 the zoo became the second most-visited zoo in the country. As of 2020, it was overall the fifth most visited tourist destination in the country.

== History ==
The zoo was founded between years 1804 and 1805. After World War II, it was nationalized and opened to the public in 1948.

== Botanical garden ==
In the area, there is also a botanical garden with 13,000 kinds of plants. The newest exhibition hall, opened in 2007, displays 250 rare plant species from tropical Yucatán.

== Lešná Castle ==
Within the area of the zoo, there is also the Lešná Castle, built by the architects Johann Mick and Viktor Siedek in 1887–1893. It is a historical mansion which contains collections of paintings, porcelain and trophies from the late 19th century.
