= Zoo Taiping =

Zoo in Larut, Matang and Selama, Perak, Malaysia

- Logo of the zoo
- Interactive map of Zoo Taiping
- 4°51′14″N 100°44′0″E
- Location: Taiping, Perak, Malaysia
- Land area: 34 acres (14 ha)
- No. of animals: 1500
- No. of species: 180
- Memberships: SEAZA
- Website: zootaiping.gov.my

The Zoo Taiping (English: Taiping Zoo) is a zoological park located at Bukit Larut, Taiping, Perak, Malaysia. Established in 1961, is the only zoo in northern Malaysia.

It is one of the major zoological parks in Malaysia. It covers 36 acres (15 ha) and exhibits 1300 animals representing 180 species of fishes, birds, mammals, and reptiles. In 2003, the zoo established a night safari, opening again at nighttime hours.

== Animals ==
The zoo has a collection of 1500 animals from 140 species. It also houses the largest number of stump-tailed macaques in Malaysia, which is thirteen, compared to six at Zoo Negara and five at Malacca Zoo.

Some of the animals in the zoo include:

Mammals

- African lion
- Agile gibbon
- Agile wallaby
- Asian elephant
- Asian golden cat
- Asian small-clawed otter
- Asiatic brush-tailed porcupine
- Axis deer
- Barking deer
- Bawean deer
- Binturong
- Black panther
- Bornean orangutan
- Capybara
- Chimpanzee
- Clouded leopard
- Common eland
- Common marmoset
- Dhole
- Fennec fox
- Gaur
- Greater mouse-deer
- Hippopotamus
- Island flying fox
- Large flying fox
- Lechwe
- Leopard cat
- Lesser mouse-deer
- Mainland serow
- Malayan flying fox
- Malayan porcupine
- Malayan tapir
- Malayan tiger
- Masked palm civet
- Nilgai
- Nyala
- Plains zebra
- Red-handed tamarin
- Sambar deer
- Serval
- Siamang
- Smooth-coated otter
- Southern giraffe
- Southern white rhinoceros
- Spectral tarsier
- Spotted hyena
- Striped skunk
- Stump-tailed macaque
- Sun bear
- Sunda slow loris
- White-handed gibbon
- Wild boar

Birds

- African grey parrot
- African spoonbill
- Amazon parrot
- Barred eagle-owl
- Black-bellied whistling duck
- Black swan
- Blue-and-yellow macaw
- Budgerigar
- Buffy fish owl
- Cattle egret
- Common hill myna
- Common ostrich
- Emu
- Eurasian griffon vulture
- Finches
- Greater flamingo
- Green peafowl
- Grey crowned crane
- Lesser whistling duck
- Mandarin duck
- Milky stork
- Mute swan
- Nicobar pigeon
- Pheasant
- Rhinoceros hornbill
- Scarlet ibis
- Southern cassowary
- Spotted wood owl
- Straw-headed bulbul
- Striated heron
- Trumpeter swan
- White-throated kingfisher
- Whooper swan

Reptiles

- African spurred tortoise
- Elongated tortoise
- False gharial
- King cobra
- Malayan box turtle
- Oriental whip snake
- Saltwater crocodile

Fish

- African giant catfish
- Arapaima
- Giant snakehead
- Mozambique tilapia
- Silver barb
- Snakehead
- Tilapia
- Tinfoil barb
