= South East Asian Zoos Association =

Association of Zoos and Aquariums
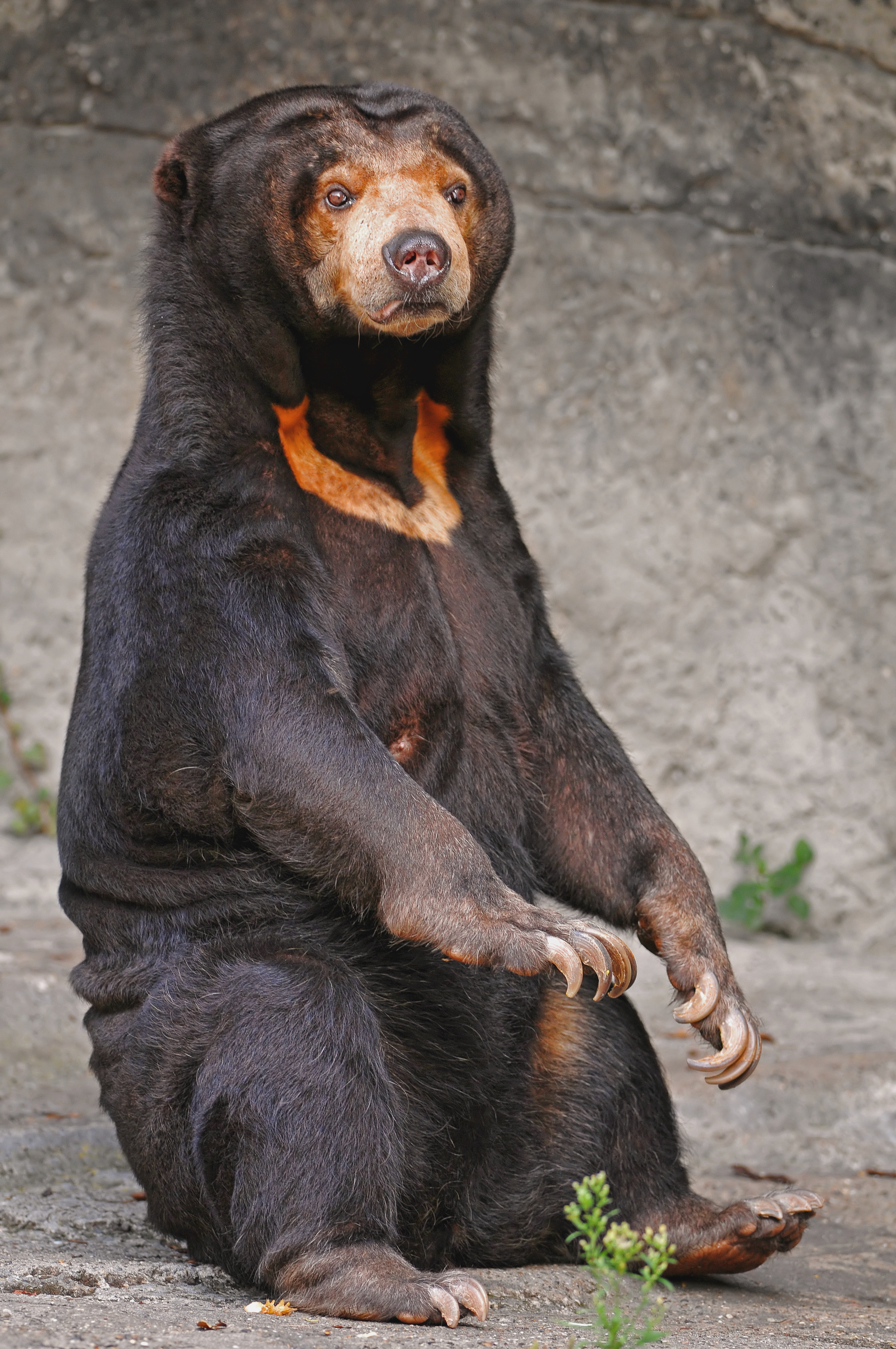
- Founded: July 1990
- Type: National not-for-profit organization
- Purpose: Zoo and aquarium accreditation and advocacy
- Location: Taipei, Taiwan
- Region served: Southeast Asia
- Method: Accreditation
- Website: seaza.asia

Southeast Asian Zoo Association (SEAZA) is the regional organization of zoos for Southeast Asia. It represents around 90 different conservatories and zoos in Southeast Asia. SEAZA became a member of the World Association of Zoos and Aquariums (WAZA) in 1990. SEAZA Headquarters are currently located in Taiwan. SEAZA is considered a sister organization to the South Asian Zoo Association for Regional Cooperation (SAZARC), which organizes zoos in Nepal, India and other countries in South Asia. Although they preside over two similar regions, the cultures and policies of the regions are too different for a single organization to govern both. The main goals of the SEAZA are to, "Strengthen in-situ conservation and management plans, to increase captive breading through research, to improve standards of non human animal welfare, to provide better recreational learning experiences for zoo visitors, to educate the public about the importance of wildlife conservation, and to promote tourism in Southeast Asia." Achieving SEAZA's goals is particularly important as Southeast Asia is one of the most biologically diverse regions in the world, but rapid, recent economic growth of these countries has caused this rare ecosystem to be put in jeopardy. However, today SEAZA is facing significant challenges that is putting its future viability in jeopardy.

== History ==
Although many zoos existed in Southeast Asia before 1990, there was no formal organization linking these zoos. As more private zoos in Southeast Asia opened to the public and as Southeast Asia became a part of the modern world, there was pressure for their zoos to meet western ethical standards. Many of these zoos had very different governing policies set by their country, while others had no formally established policy. This led to the desire to create some form of governing body that could set standards for all types of zoos across the region. The initiative to form an association of zoos in SEA originated at a conference of zoos held in 1988 at the National Zoo of Malaysia. The Director of National Zoo of Malaysia, Idris Malik, wrote the proposal for the creation of SEAZA. In 1989, the zoos met again and the retired Indonesian Military Director, Danudirdjo Ashari, pushed the organization into the official stage and brought it to the WAZA, where it was officially recognized as a member in 1990. Danudirdjo served as the President of SEAZA from 1993 to 1995. Bernard Harrison, the Director of the Singapore Zoo, became President in 1996. At that time, many of the zoos had no operating guidelines or policies. Harrison worked with all the members of SEAZA to establish a written constitution that would guide behavior for zoos in Southeast Asia in 1998. Harrison also established sub committees on breeding, ethics, conservation, and public education. He instituted yearly meetings instead of bi-yearly meetings in 1998. This was motivated in part by the economic crisis of 1997 that started in Thailand and caused the SEAZA to miss their scheduled meeting in Ho Chi Minh City. In 2001 SEAZA held its 10th meeting in Malaysia to establish their sisterhood with SAZARC.

In the mid-2000s, Dr Phan Viet Lam, the director of the Saigon Zoo, took over as president and is currently in office. SEAZA held its 21st yearly conference in November 2013 in Ho Chi Minh City, Vietnam. The conference had six focus areas: breeding and zoo veterinary services, marketing and zoo education, biodiversity and conservation, zoo design and environment enrichment, ethical standards in animal care, and multiplication and animal habitat. Representatives from all 12 countries and territories were present. The 22nd SEAZA conference was scheduled to take place at the Taipei Zoo in October 2014. The theme of this year's conference is developing a "One Plan Approach" with focused sessions on standardizing economic policies and procedures with a connection to marketing, creating a sustainable standard of animal care, and veterinarian education in areas such as radiology and ultrasounds.

== Philosophy and Beliefs ==
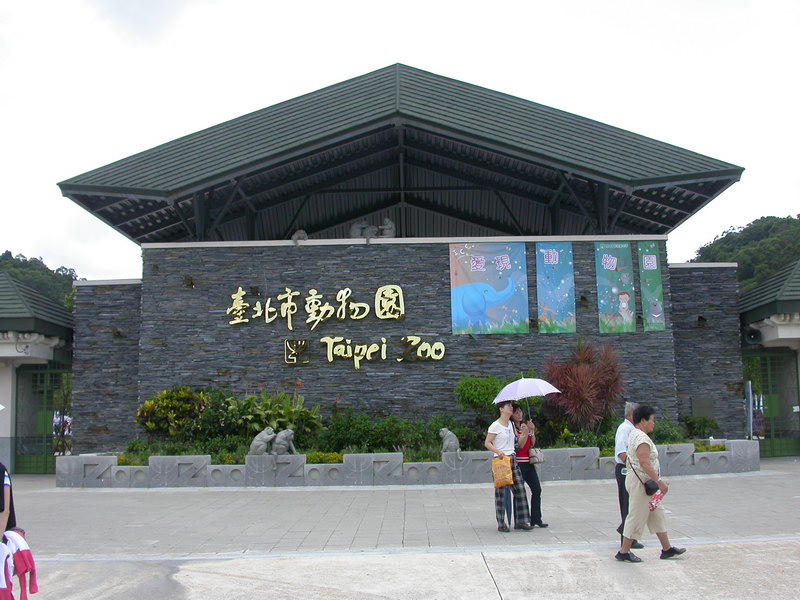
Entrance to the Taipei Zoo

SEAZA deals with more diverse cultural and economic environments than most members of WAZA. Consequently, SEAZA is the only member of the WAZA that does not have completely universal Ethical and Welfare standards across zoos. However, all members must meet certain baselines and provide certain rights to remain a part of SEAZA. These are as follows, • Animals should have access to sufficient food • Access to sufficient drinking water • Shelter to inclement weather • A clean enclosure to reduce the spread of infectious diseases • Responsible staff to care for them when they are in distress • All animals should exhibit normal behavior. While these are universally defined health standards, differences in religious beliefs from country to country prevent a prescriptive approach to defining how animals are cared for. For example, because Thailand is a Buddhist nation, they are forbidden from even euthanizing animals that are sick and in pain with no hope of recovery. Because of these varying beliefs, the Ethics Committee of SEAZA takes into account the ethical standards of the country and the people who work there. In addition to respecting the regional ethical beliefs of the area where a zoo is located, SEAZA tries not to favor rich zoos over poor zoos. SEAZA is the only world zoo organization with different membership criteria for rich zoos and poor zoos. This has led some experts to claim that the SEAZA is more like an organization of refugee camps for animals who were displaced from their natural habitats. With respect to conservation and species rehabilitation, SEAZA attempts to enforce the mandates of the Convention on International Trade of Endangered species (CITES) established in Geneva Switzerland in 1973 that set up policies on trading and exporting animals across international borders. Many Southeast Asia animals are heavily regulated under this treaty, due to a recent loss of habitat.

== Structure of SEAZA and organization ==
According to the SEAZA constitution written in 1998, SEAZA has defined a zoo as "zoological gardens, biological parks, safari parks, public aquariums, bird parks, reptile parks insectariums, and other collections of wildlife primarily for public exhibition." While this is the general definition, most of the members of SEAZA are traditional zoos located on approximately 300 acres of land, have anywhere from 200-500 animals, about 35-40 zookeepers, and 2-4 veterinarians. There are two different membership categories. The first is a Southeast Asia institutional ordinary member. These members are zoo, wild life parks, and conservancies that meet the SEAZA standards. These standards are as follows. - Have regular and predictable visiting hours that are convenient for the public. - Provide a comprehensive exhibit of animals that spans beyond domestic pets. - Have a primary mission of the member to exhibit, conserve, and preserve the world's fauna in a scientific and educational manner. - Promote these goals throughout other zoos. The second class of members is an associate member, which consists of organizations and non-profit groups that support SEAZA, but have no geographical ties to the region. There is a General Assembly consisting of one of representative from each of the member countries. The representative is the President of the national zoo of each of the countries or territories. In the case of a country or territory with no national zoo, the zoos in that country must come to a consensus on their representative. The General Assembly is mandated to meet every three years, but typically meets each year. They can decide new policies and procedure through a majority rules voting system. There is an Executive Board that has three members. It is led by a President who is elected for three-year terms by the General Assembly and can run for as many terms as he would like. A Vice President is also elected every three years. The final member of the committee is the immediate Past President. The Executive Board can establish any committees that they feel are necessary. The Executive Board meets twice a year at minimum. In these meetings they discuss budget and reports of the committees.

The final permanent governance body is the Ethics and Welfare Committee. At the SEAZA conference in 1998, the Executive Board became concerned with the ethics and welfare standards in the zoos. They decided to initiate a committee for animal welfare. They appointed Govindasamy Agoramoorthy from the Tajen Institute of Technology in Thailand as the head of the committee. The objective of the survey was not to scientifically assess these zoos against western standards, but to evaluate zoos based upon their cultural and regional ethical standards, to identify, fix and prevent welfare related problems in the zoos of Southeast Asia. All zoos that were deemed representative of Zoos in Southeast Asia by the SEAZA board were informed of the evaluation, and then given the opportunity of inviting the ethics board to their zoo. The ethics and welfare evaluation committee consisted of Zoo manager's, both from the zoo under investigation, Conservation specialist and animal rights activists. These committee members and 3-6 workers at each zoo formed an evaluation committee. This was done to ensure that the local ethics of a region were taken into account when evaluating a zoo. A special focus was paid to animal husbandry, disposal of surplus animals and acquisition of animals for breeding purposes. At each zoo, evaluators picked the animals they specifically wanted to focus on. The evaluation focused on elephants Asiatic black bears, and orangutans because large animals require higher living standards, and more stimulation. Finally these animals were chosen because they are deemed critical to the conservation efforts of the countries of Southeast Asia. This has now become a standing committee overseen directly by the President. Its job is to define ethics standards and perform ethics evaluations at frequent intervals to make sure that all member zoos meet the ethics and welfare standards. The headquarters of the SEAZA is located at the zoo of the current president.

== List of SEAZA member zoos and aquariums ==
Name	Country	Membership Status	Type
Batu Secret Zoo	Indonesia	Institutional	Zoo
Gembria Loka Zoo	Indonesia	Institutional	Zoo
Ragunan Zoological Park (formerly Ragunan Wildlife Park)	Indonesia	Institutional	Zoo
Surabaya Zoo	Indonesia	Institutional	Zoo
Taman Hewan Pematangsiantar	Indonesia	Institutional	Zoo
Taman Safari	Indonesia	Institutional	Safari park
Hong Kong Zoological and Botanical Gardens	Hong Kong	Institutional	Zoo
Kadoorie Farm and Botanic Garden	Hong Kong	Institutional	Zoo
A'Famosa Safari Wonderland	Malaysia	Institutional	Safari park
Zoo Melaka and Night Safari	Malaysia	Institutional	Zoo
Zoo Negara Malaysia	Malaysia	Institutional	Zoo
Zoo Taiping and Night Safari	Malaysia	Institutional	Zoo
Htoo Zoos and Gardens	Myanmar	Institutional	Zoo
Avilon Wildlife Conservation Foundation, Inc.	Philippines	Institutional	Zoo
Cebu Safari and Adventure Park	Philippines	Institutional	Zoo
Philippine Eagle Foundation	Philippines	Institutional	Zoo
Zoo World Philippines	Philippines	Institutional	Zoo
Mandai Wildlife Group (incl. Singapore Zoo, Night Safari, Bird Paradise and River Wonders)	Singapore	Institutional	Zoo
Hsinchu City Zoo	Republic of China	Institutional	Zoo
National Museum of Marine Biology and Aquarium	Republic of China	Institutional	Aquarium
Penghu Aquarium	Republic of China	Institutional	Aquarium
Shou Shan Zoo	Republic of China	Institutional	Zoo
Taipei Zoo	Republic of China	Institutional	Zoo
Wanpi World Safari Zoo	Republic of China	Institutional	Zoo
Chiang Mai Night Safari	Thailand	Institutional	Safari park
Peuan Deratchan Mini Zoo	Thailand	Institutional	Zoo
Zoological Park Organization of Thailand (incl. Chiang Mai Zoo, Dusit Zoo, Khao Kheow Open Zoo, Nakhon Rataschima Zoo and Songkhla Zoo)	Thailand	Institutional	Zoo
Đại Nam Văn Hiến	Vietnam	Institutional	Zoo
Hanoi Zoological Gardens	Vietnam	Institutional	Zoo
My Quynh Zoo	Vietnam	Institutional	Safari park
Saigon Zoo and Botanical Gardens	Vietnam	Institutional	Zoo
Vinpearl Safari Phú Quốc	Vietnam	Institutional	Safari park
Al Bustan Zoological Centre	United Arab Emirates	Affiliate	Zoo
Emirates Park Zoo & Resort	United Arab Emirates	Affiliate	Zoo
Chimelong Safari Park	People's Republic of China	Affiliate	Safari park
Zlin-Lesna Zoo	Czech Republic	Affiliate	Zoo
Almaty Zoological Park	Kazakhstan	Affiliate	Zoo
Novosibirsk Zoological Park	Russian Federation	Affiliate	Zoo
Seoul Grand Park Zoo	South Korea	Affiliate	Zoo
Sydney Zoo	Australia	Affiliate	Zoo
Taronga Zoo Sydney (Taronga Zoological Park)	Australia	Affiliate	Zoo

== Problems and Poverty ==
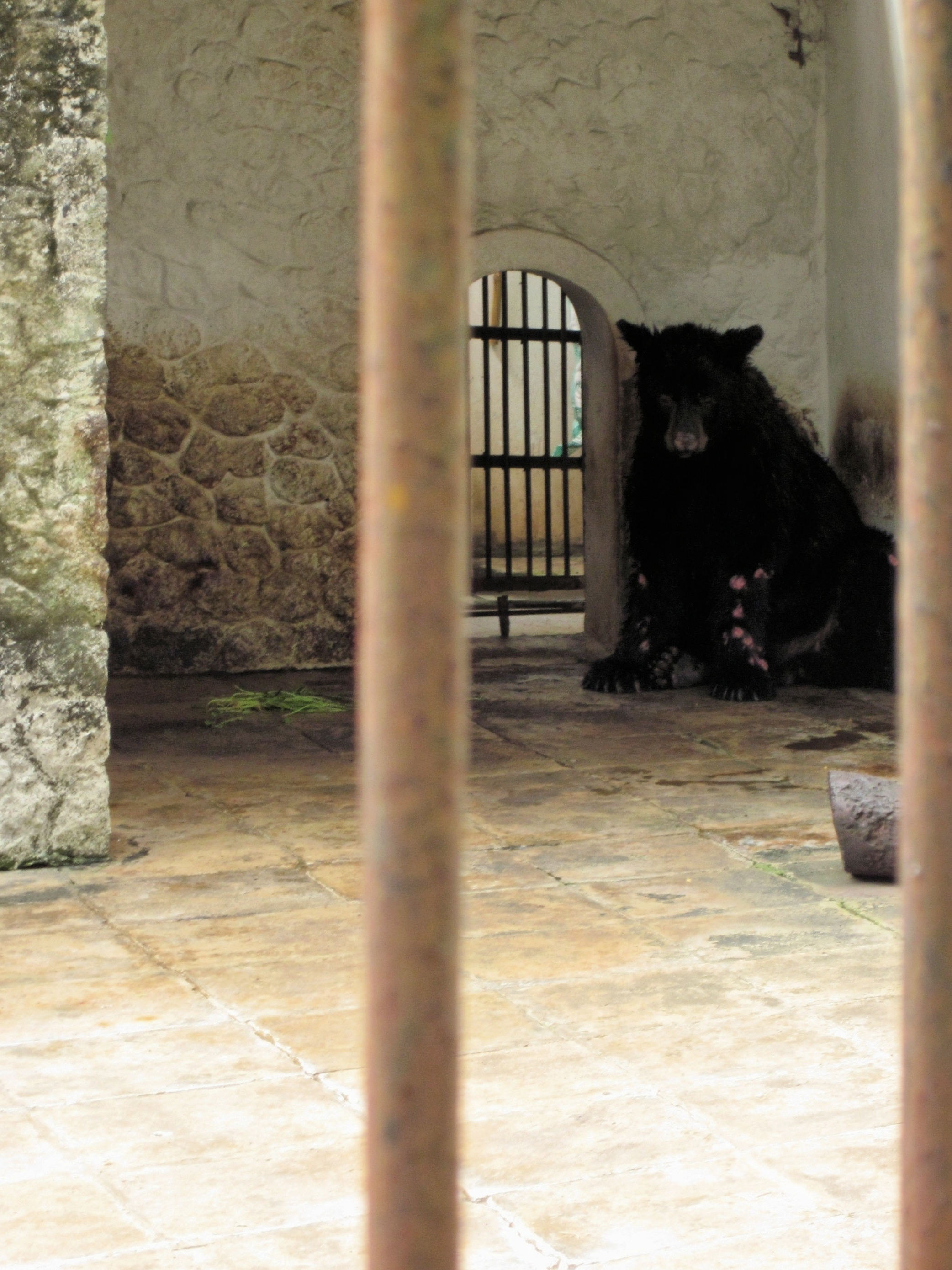
The American Black Bear in the Surabaya (Indonesia) Zoo suffers from skin disease.

The Convention on International Trade of Endangered species CITES regulates all animal trade, rescue and reintroduction into the wild on the global level. However many countries in Southeast Asia view this agreement as a secondary concern. Most policies in Southeast Asia focus on the conservation of entire ecosystems and little on specific species that are endangered. Because Southeast Asia nations lack the resources to support both imperatives, SEAZA has a hard time enforcing the regulations of CITES prohibiting exhibiting some animals illegally and controlling the exportation of native species such as sun bears. Due to SEAZA's inability to regulate some species, many private internationally conservations and organizations have stepped in for the protection and preservation of specific species such as Malaysian sun bear. The Ho Chi Minh City Zoo has a partnership with the Cologne Zoo in Germany. The Cologne Zoo works with SEAZA to conserve insect and reptile species, as well as working with Malaysia to rehabilitate the Malaysian sun bear species. In fact the Malaysian sun bear studbook is at the Cologne Zoo.

Most of the zoos in Southeast Asia, with the noticeable exception of Singapore, can be classified as in some sort of critical status. There are two major contributing factors to this issue. The first of these is that most of the 12 countries that make up SEAZA cannot afford to supply a substantial budget to zoos. Most of these zoos struggle to meet the minimum standards of wellness, while many others fall below it. As well as government not being able to fund zoos, tourism is not covering the cost of zoos because most international tourists prefer to visit sanctuaries such as the Sun Bear Sanctuary in Malaysia, which is a privately owned, for-profit organization. The second contributing factor to the problems of the zoos is that most of the natural environment of the animals that live in Southeast Asia (58% of all animal species in the world) is being destroyed by deforestation and rapid development. Most government-funded zoos are required to take rescue animals whether or not they have the ability, capacity, or budget to take in these recently displaced animals. As a result of a barely sufficient budget and a recent influx of displaced animals, most zoos are struggling with overcrowding and a surplus of animals. Another issue is that because of this poverty, WAZA and CITES have enforced policies about whether these zoos can have animals from other countries. For example, the Thailand Zoo has been rejected multiple times for the acquisition of a kangaroo, even though they are quite common in Australia and kangaroo meat is readily available in Thailand. This has reduced revenue from domestic tourism. Many SEAZA conventional zoos (non-sanctuary or wildlife parks) have come under direct scrutiny, and most are falling below standards, causing fractures in the foundation of SEAZA, and rather than stepping up to fix these standards, the once prominent organization appears to be retreating away from the line of sight of western countries and scrutiny. Two specific incidents illustrate unfortunate trends. In the 1998 tai ping gorilla incident, many gorillas in Thailand were found to be undocumented and owned illegally. This spurred a series of investigations and allegations about SEAZA and was followed by a series of police raids on zoos and conservatory parks. The largest controversy for SEAZA started in 2014 at the Surabaya Zoo. It has been called the "Indonesia Zoo of Death". The controversy started in January 2014 when a young lion was found hanged in his cage, after suspiciously getting caught in his ropes while playing. The Zoo destroyed the evidence before a police investigation could take place. This incident started an investigation where many animals were found to be kept in poor condition and suffering from disease or malnutrition and neglect from keepers. There are currently many petitions to shut down the Zoo. SEAZA has made no formal statement about the Zoo. As a result, WAZA has directly started to investigate the zoo.

== The Future of SEAZA ==
In recent years the level of competence within SEAZA appears to have declined. In 2005 an Ethics Board was scheduled to report on welfare and living standards of the animals in the zoos across Southeast Asia, but no report has been published The website for SEAZA became inaccessible in 2010. The organization is still in existence and a member of WAZA, bit its ability to monitor the zoos of Southeast Asia is in question As certain zoos grow successfully, like the Singapore National Zoo, and others struggle, like the Dusit Zoo in Thailand, it may have become impossible for a single organization and set of standards to cover the extremely economically diversified zoos of Southeast Asia. With current issues surrounding SEAZA and the deforestation and future endangerment of many SEA species of animals there is much that is requiring action. One possible future for these zoos involves more developed and richer zoos helping with animal rehabilitation and rescue efforts. This includes taking some of the surplus animals as to not stress conditions and resources any farther than they are now. Another potential mitigation for the current issues that was discussed during the 2013 SEAZA Conference stressed the importance of partnerships with Western zoos such as the Cologne Zoo. It is unclear the direction that the SEAZA Conference will take in 2014 after the recent controversies and public attention that some of its members have received. However, actions will be required to reestablish SEAZA as an effective organization and advocate for endangered species.

== See also ==
- Central Zoo Authority of India
- List of zoo associations
