= List of botanical gardens in Vietnam =

Botanical gardens in Vietnam have collections consisting entirely of Vietnam native and endemic species; most have a collection that include plants from around the world. There are botanical gardens and arboreta in all states and territories of Vietnam, most are administered by local governments, some are privately owned.

- Saigon Zoo and Botanical Gardens
- Da lat botanical garden
- Bach Thao Park or Hanoi Botanical Garden
