= Lahore Zoo =

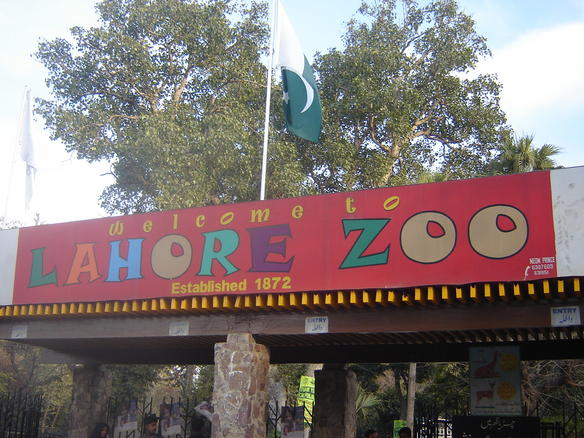
- Main entrance of the zoo
- Interactive map of Lahore Zoo
- 31°33′22″N 74°19′33″E
- Date opened: 1872
- Location: Mall Road, Lahore, Punjab, Pakistan
- Land area: 10 ha
- No. of animals: ~1400
- No. of species: ~140
- Annual visitors: 3 million
- Memberships: South Asian Zoo Association for Regional Cooperation
- Major exhibits: Elephant House, Giraffe House, Lion House
- Website: www.lahorezoo.com.pk

Lahore Zoo (Punjabi: لہور چڑیا گھر, Urdu: لاہور چڑیا گھر) in Lahore, Punjab, Pakistan, established in 1872, is one of the largest zoos in Pakistan. It is currently managed by the Forest, Wildlife and Fisheries department of the Government of Pakistan. Today the zoo houses a collection of about 1378 animals of 135 species. Lahore Zoo was the host of the fifth annual conference of SAZARC in 2004.

Lahore Zoo is the third oldest zoo in the world. House of Vienna Zoo of Austria, established in 1752 as a menagerie, was opened to public as a zoo in 1779. London Zoo of England, established in 1828, was opened to public in 1847.

== History ==
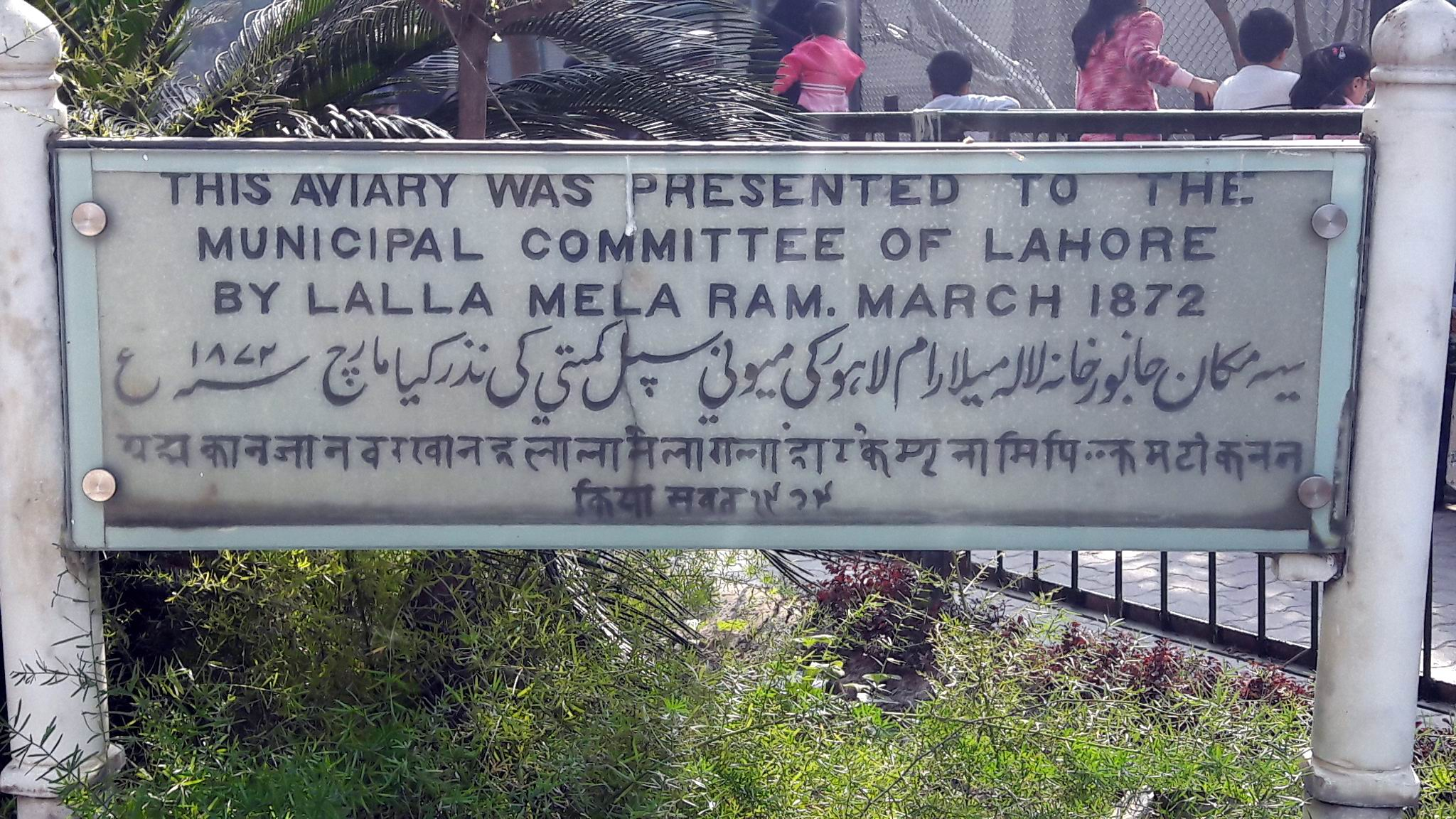
Donated by Lal Mahundra Ram in 1872

Lahore Zoo had its beginnings in a small aviary donated by Lala Mela Ram in 1872 to the Lahore Municipal Corporation. Over time the animal collection increased and the zoo expanded. It later began to take interest in conservation, education and research in addition to providing recreational facilities to the public. By 2010, the zoo was home to about 1280 trees of 71 species and 1380 animals of 136 species including 996 birds of 82 species, 49 reptiles of 8 and 336 mammals of 45 species.

The zoo was managed by the Lahore Municipal Corporation from 1872 to 1923, when management was turned over to the Deputy Commissioner of Lahore. Management was transferred to the Livestock and Dairy Development department in 1962, and then to the Wildlife and Parks department in 1982. Between its founding in 1872 and its turnover to the Wildlife and Parks department in 1982 there was very little development at the zoo. Since 1982, it has upgraded its exhibits, layout, and landscaping, and has become a self-financing organization.

An 18-month master planning, improvement and development project for the zoo was approved on July 25, 2005. It was carried out by 'Zoo Maintenance Committee' and sponsored by Planning and Development Department of Government of Punjab. The project cost around 202.830 million Pakistani rupees and aimed for the improvement and addition of facilities.

In November 2023, the zoo closed temporarily for renovations. As part of the plan, the zoo will be revamped on the "Singaporean style" with glass cages being installed, the cages incorporating a naturally habitat of the animals, a hologram, and new arrivals including the Giant Panda.

== Areas and attractions ==
=== Fancy Birds Aviary ===
Located just east of the zoo's main entrance, this is the oldest section of the zoo, as the zoo itself started out as an aviary in 1872. It is home to most of the zoo's gamebirds and parrots. The area consists of four rows of double-sided bird cages housing peafowl, pheasants, partridges, western crowned pigeons and various species of parrots including macaws, grey parrots and conures, among others. Located at the eastern end of this section are a row of enclosures housing a pack of Asiatic jackals, juvenile spur-thighed tortoises and Asian houbara. Nearby is a small enclosure, once home to smooth-coated otters, housing Indian flapshell turtles and red-eared sliders, this enclosure also acts as temporary holding pen for the zoo's juvenile mugger crocodiles.

=== Lion House ===
Originally constructed in 1872, the current Lion House complex, covering an area of 2,276 m^{2} (24,500 sq ft) was built in 1987 at a cost of 5.1 million rupees and was renovated in 2012. It comprises three concrete buildings with indoor cages and each building have two adjoining outdoor enclosures. The first of these buildings is home to the zoo's Bengal tigers and pumas. Lahore Zoo currently has fifteen tigers and three pumas, most of which have been born at the zoo. The second building, consisting of three indoor compartments and two outdoor enclosures, houses the zoo's lions. From the 2015 to 2016 13 lion cubs were born at the zoo, currently the zoo is home to more than 20 lions. The third, and final, building is home to the zoo's family of black bears. The zoo's resident black bear pair has given birth to two litters of two cubs, born in 2009 and 2011, all of which currently reside at the zoo. This is the only enclosure in the Lion House that does not have indoor viewing for visitors. However, the maintenance is poor and you will find Tiger in Lion's cage and Lioness in Tiger's cage.

=== Elephant House ===
Constructed in 1972 at a cost of 500,000 rupees, this is one of the most popular attractions of the zoo. It consists of three large indoor rooms each with adjoining outdoor paddocks. Originally housing three endangered pachyderm species native to Africa, The African bush elephant, the Southern white rhinoceros, and the hippopotamus, it currently houses a female hippo, Rani, that was brought to the zoo in July 2006 and a male white rhinoceros. The zoo's only elephant, Suzi, which had been resident at the zoo since 1988 died in May, 2017, from several illnesses, leaving the zoo without an elephant. The zoo's male hippo, Raja, was brought to the zoo in 1974 and at the time of his death, in October, 2015, was the oldest resident of the zoo, at 51. There had been attempts by the zoo administration to breed hippos but these had failed due to Raja's old age. The zoo's female white rhino, Kawo, died in 2014 on account of old age.

=== Monkey House ===
Constructed in 2012 over Lahore Zoo's previous out of date monkey house, these four new enclosure are located just west of the zoo's main entrance of main gate. The first enclosure houses the zoo's olive baboon family, currently numbering around nine individuals. The next two enclosure houses a pair of tufted capuchins and mantled guerezas. The final enclosure is home to a family of vervet monkeys. Housed, in nearby enclosures, are the zoo's family of porcupines, adult spur-thighed tortoises and a pair of smooth-coated otters. Species previously housed in the Monkey House include black-footed grey langurs, mandrills and spider monkeys.

=== Chimpanzee House ===
Home to the zoo's chimpanzees, this building houses a wide array of other species including wolves, swamp cats and rhesus macaques. The zoo's first pair of chimps, male Romeo and female Julie, had been brought in 1994. A male chimp, Tinku was born to the pair in 2000 but died due to pneumonia in September, 2004. In August, 2001, Julie gave birth to two female chimps, named Pinky and Honey. Romeo died, also of pneumonia, in 2008. Juliet succumbed to hepatitis in 2012 and Pinky died in 2014, leaving Honey the only chimpanzee left at the zoo. This building also acts as a temporary holding area for various species of cats, including leopards, lions and pumas. Species previously housed here include cheetahs and baboons.

=== Waterfowl Lake ===
Located south of the Fancy Aviary, this lake houses various species of waterfowl and wading birds. It consists of four islands with some of the oldest trees in the zoo. Located adjacent to the enclosure is a banyan tree that is reported to be over 400 years old. Species housed in this part of the zoo include black swans, Muscovy ducks, lesser flamingos and Dalmatian pelicans. Located nearby is a small enclosure housing a pair of wild boars.

=== Reptile House ===
This building houses most of the zoo's reptiles, including Indian cobras, Sindh kraits, saw-scaled vipers and Indian pythons. The Reptile House was renovated in 2006, providing better ventilation to the exhibits and air conditioning for the animals. A small taxidermy museum, displaying various species of animals that previously lived at the zoo, is also present in the building. This visit is separately charged and the enclosures are in a dirty condition.

=== Walk-through Aviary ===
Located directly east of the Reptile House, the three-domed walk-through aviary is relatively new construction. Entry to the aviary is not included in general admission ticket of the zoo. Species housed in this enclosure include various species of pheasants, Indian peafowl and demoiselle cranes. As of 2015 the Walk-through Aviary was not open to the public.

=== Chimpanzee Island ===
This is a large moated enclosure located south of the waterfowl lake that was originally created to house the zoo's chimpanzee, but because of deaths of all but one of the chimpanzees, this enclosure currently houses a pair of Himalayan brown bears.

=== Urial hillock ===
Located on west of, and right in front of the entrance to, the Reptile House, is a small naturally created hill that is home to urials and mouflons held in two separate enclosures.

=== Others ===
Other notable animals found at Lahore Zoo include giraffes, mugger crocodiles, blackbucks, nilgais, red deer, hog deer, guanacos, plains zebra, ostrich, emus and southern cassowary, vulturine guineafowl.

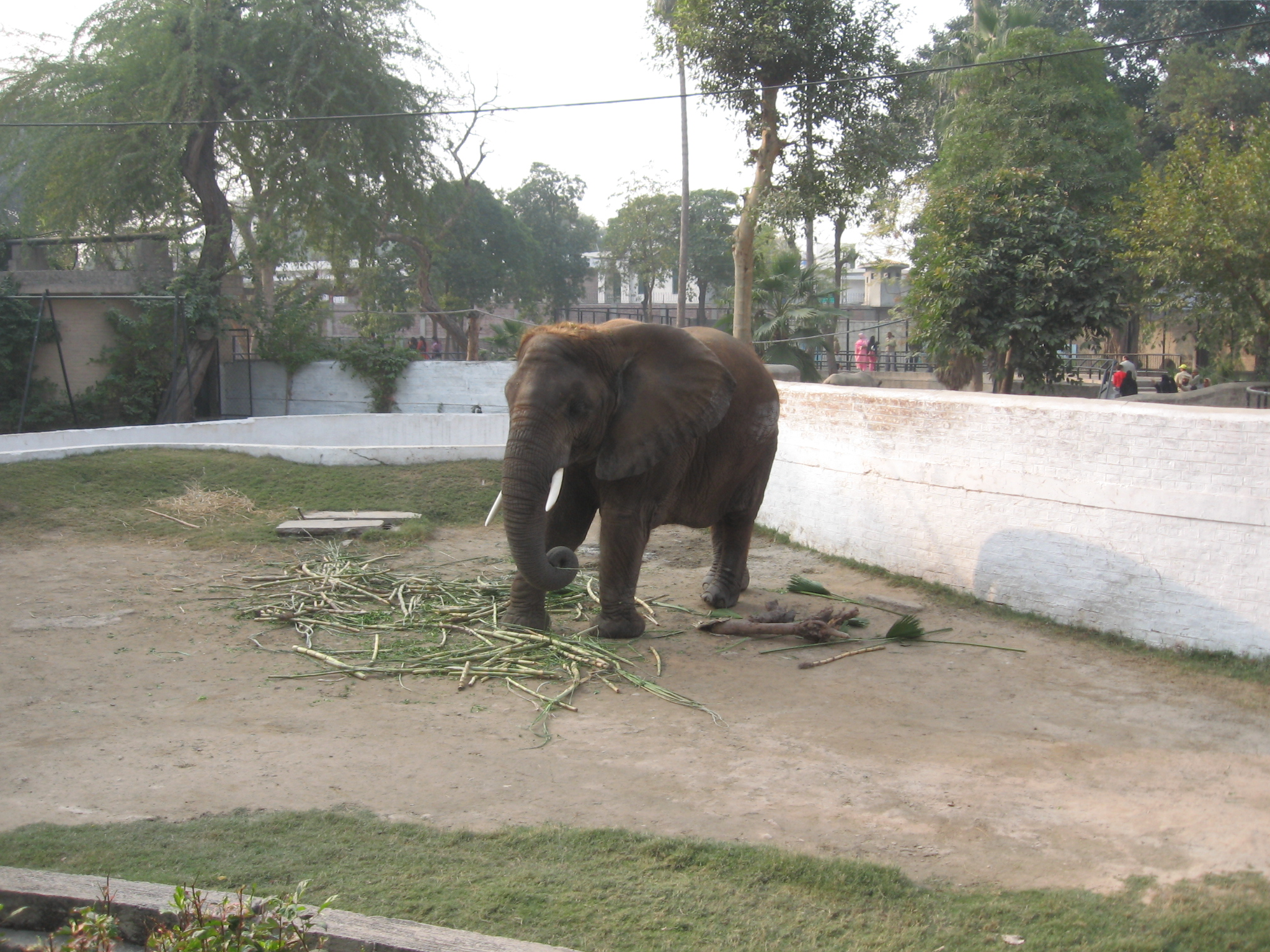
Suzi, the African elephant

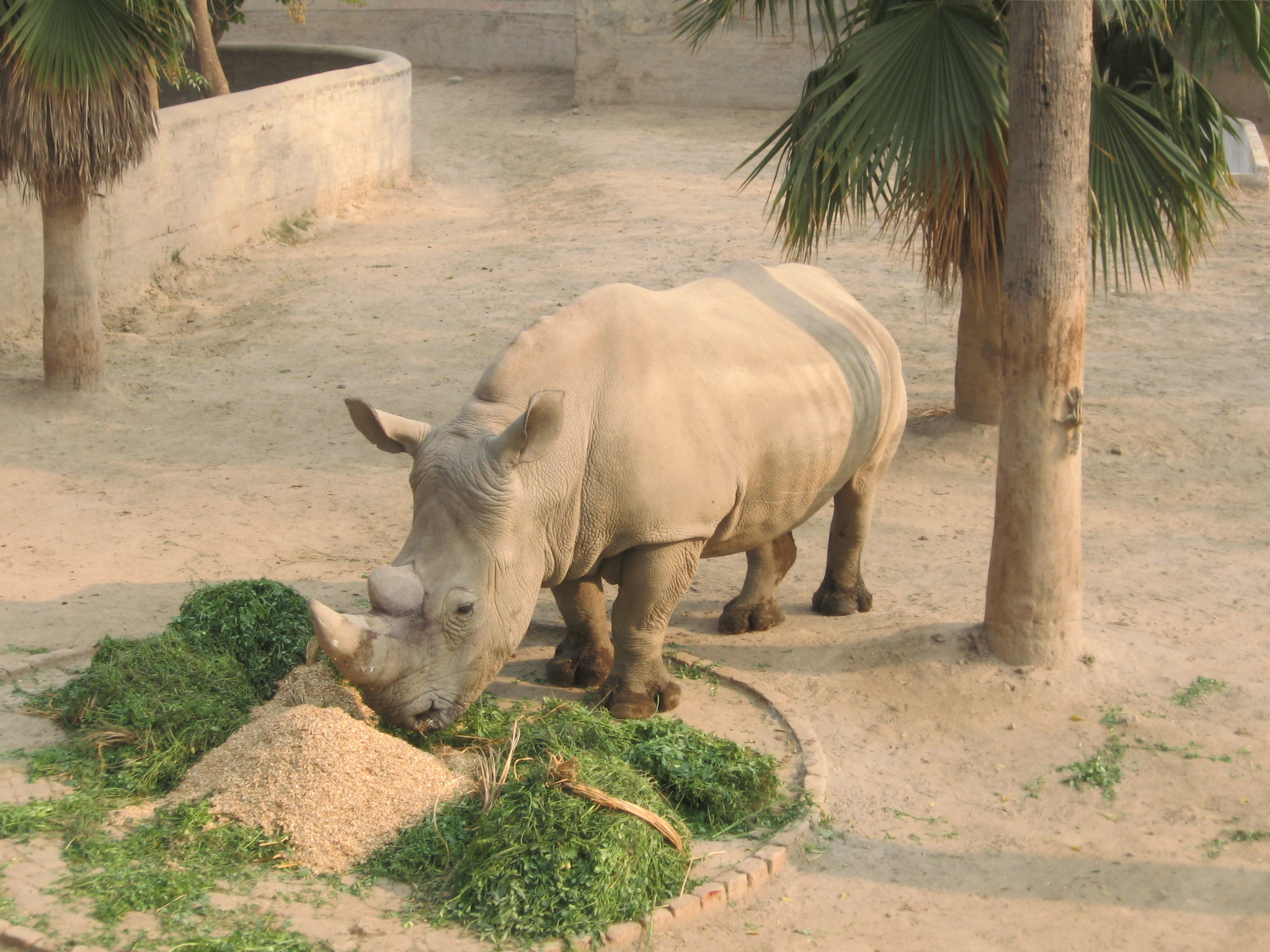
A white rhinoceros

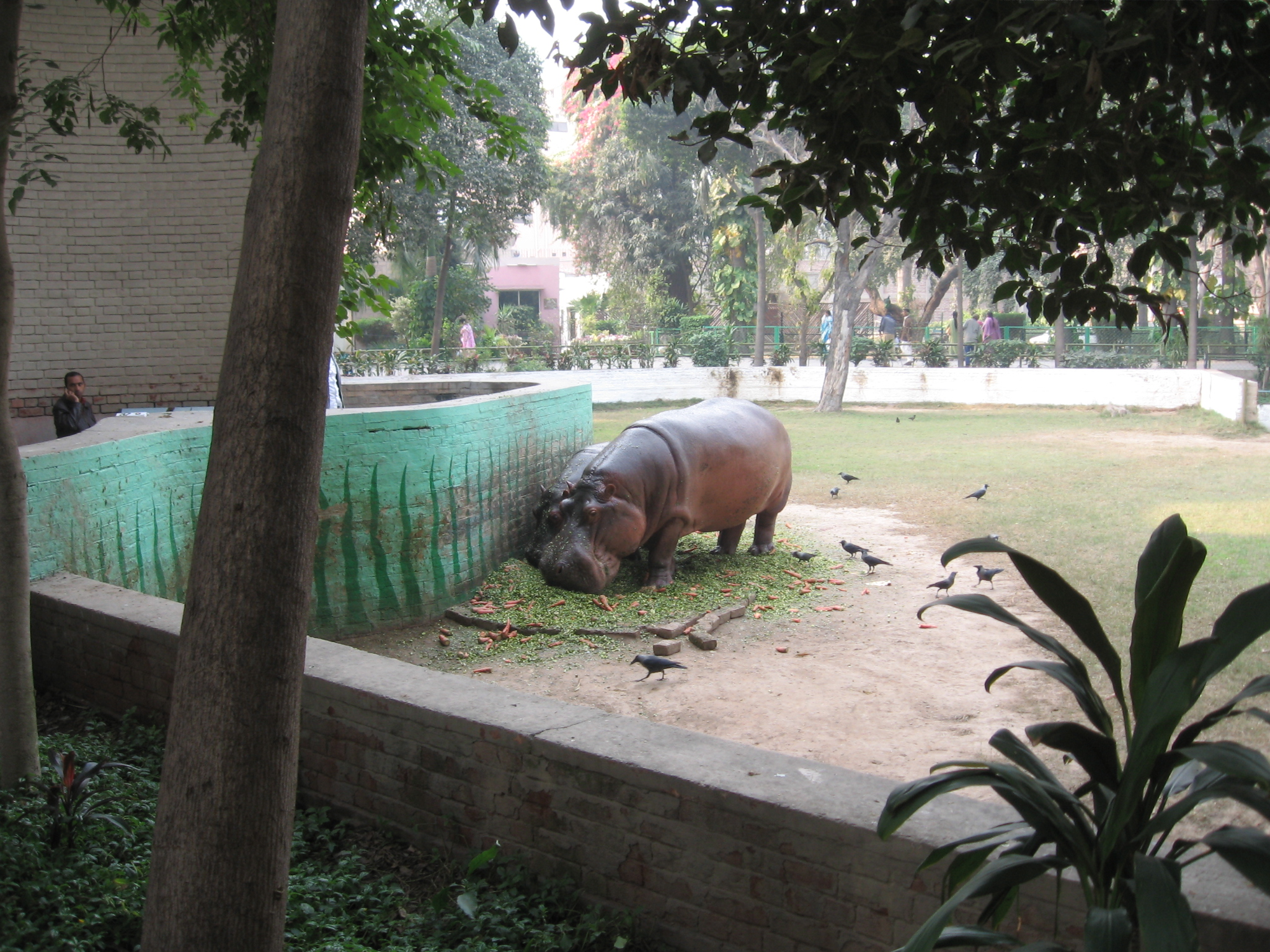
The late Raja, the hippopotamus

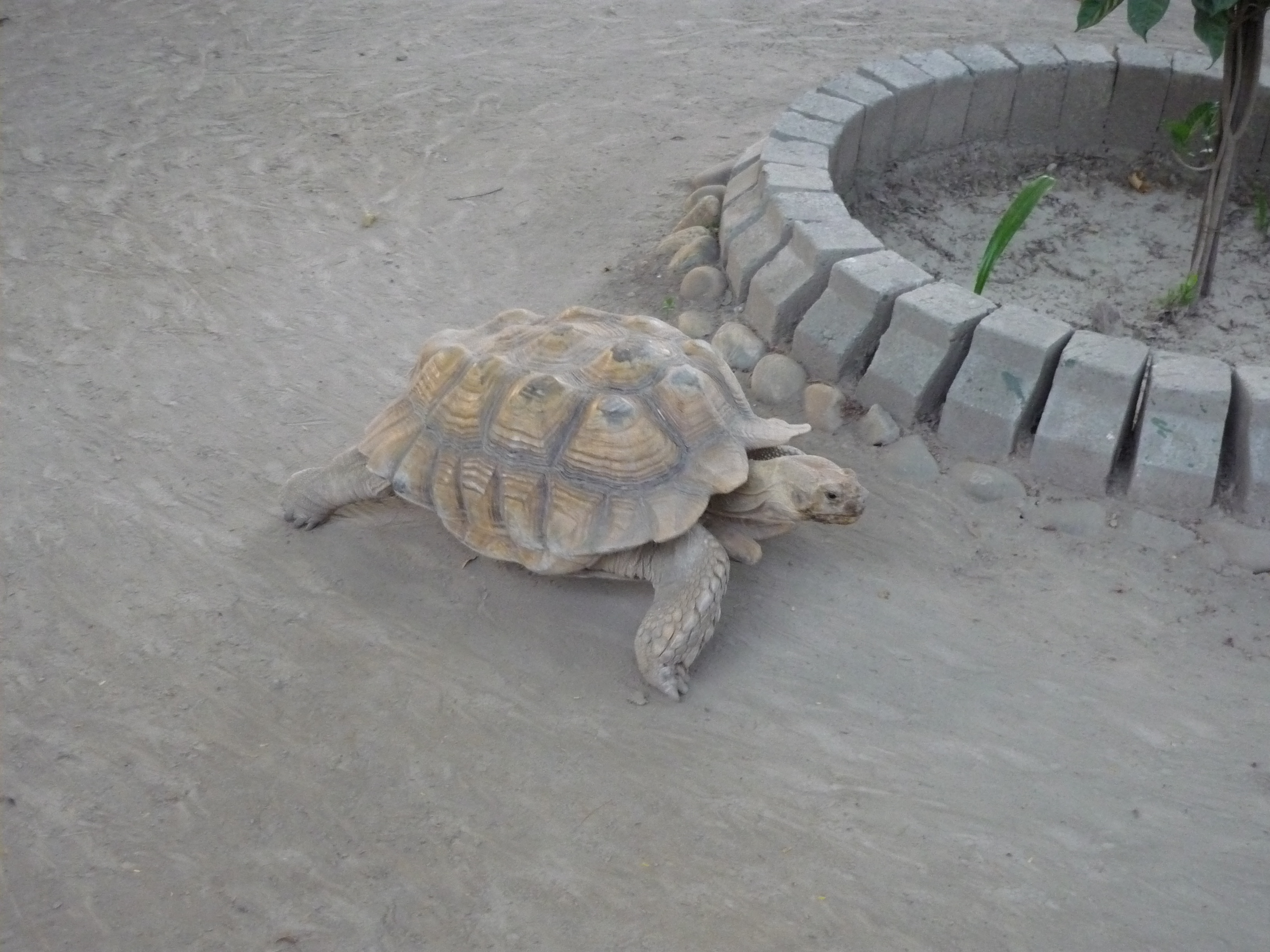
A spur-thighed tortoise

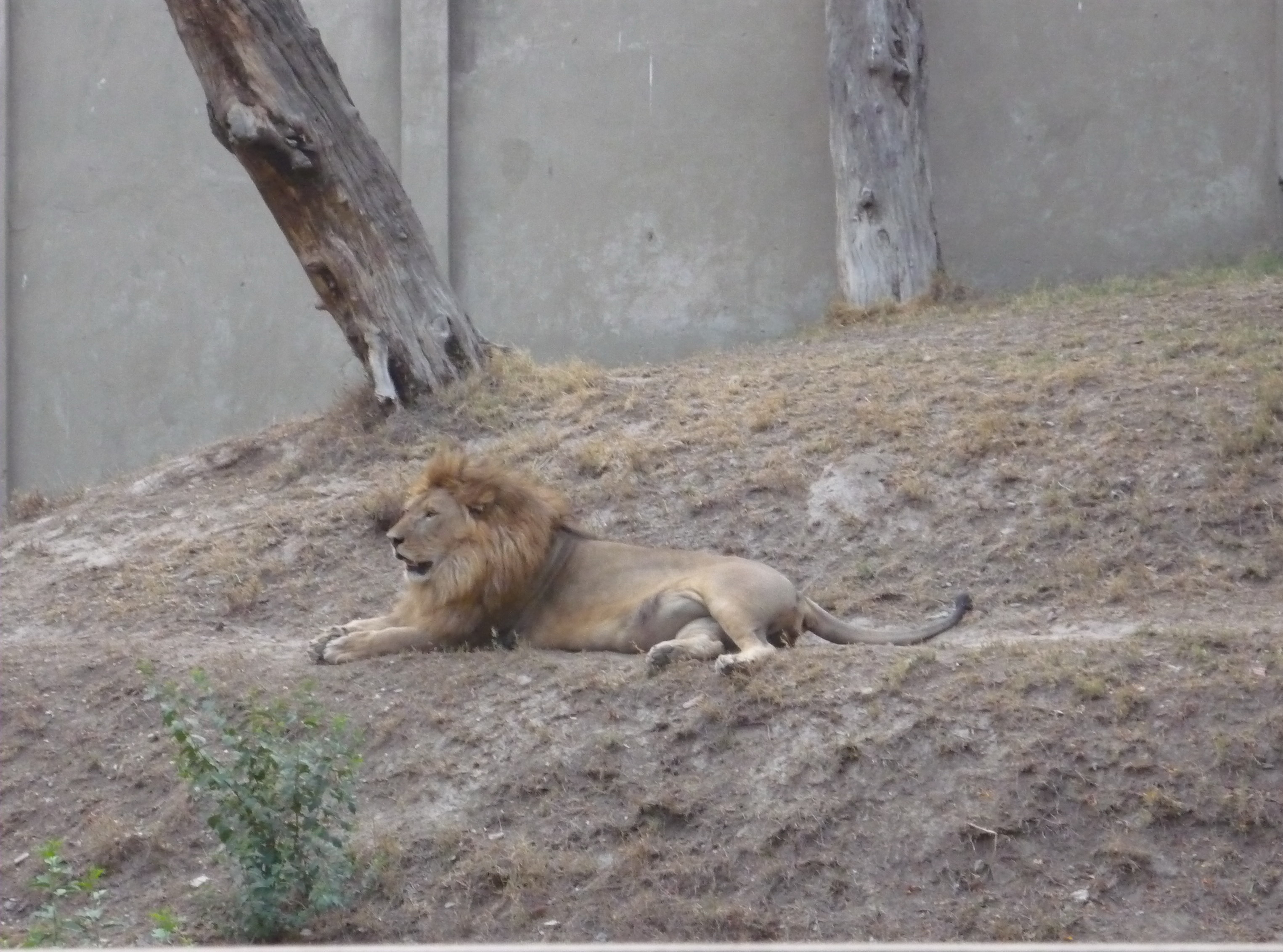
A lion

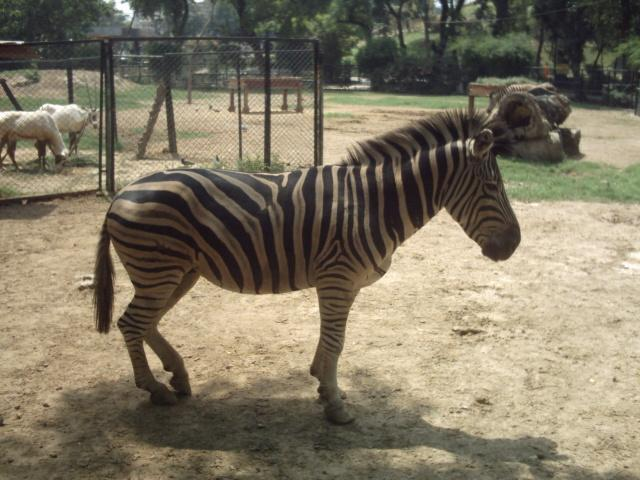
A plains zebra

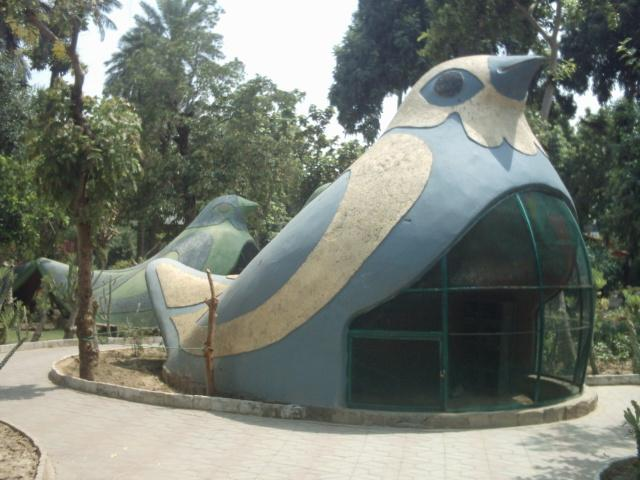
A bird cage

=== Exotic flora ===
Lahore Zoo has about 1280 trees of 71 species. Many of the exotic species have information boards to promote education. Some of these are listed below:

- Alstonia scholaris - locally termed ditabark - native to India and Pakistan
- Bombax ceiba- sunbal or silk cotton tree - native to Himalayas
- Callistemon citrinus - bottle brush - native to Australia
- Dalbergia sissoo - shisham - native to India and Pakistan
- Delonix regia - gulmohar - native to Madagascar
- Erythrina suberosa - coral or gul nister - native to Myanmar
- Ficus benghalensis - banyan - native to Bangladesh
- Ficus religiosa - pipal - native to India and Pakistan
- Ficus retusa - bobari - native to Malaysia
- Kigelia africana - gul-e-fanoos or sausage - native to Africa
- Livistona chinensis - bottle palm - native to China
- Mangifera indica - aam - native to India and Pakistan
- Mimusops elengi - molsery - native to Pakistan
- Pongamia pinnata - sukh chayn or Indian beech - native to Himalayas
- Syzygium cumini - jamu - native to India and Pakistan
- Ziziphus zizyphus - jujube - native to Himalayas
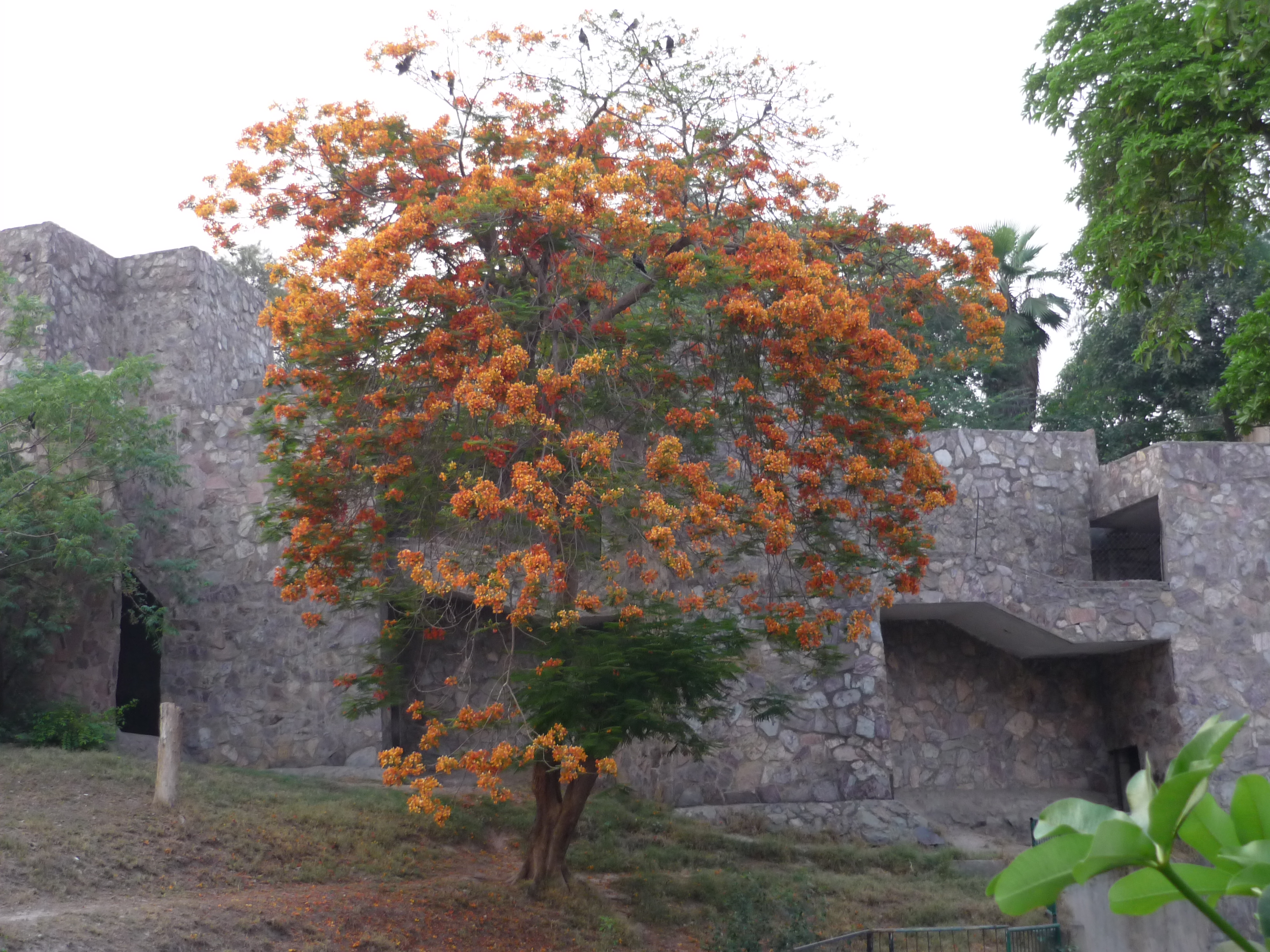
A coral tree (Erythrina suberosa)

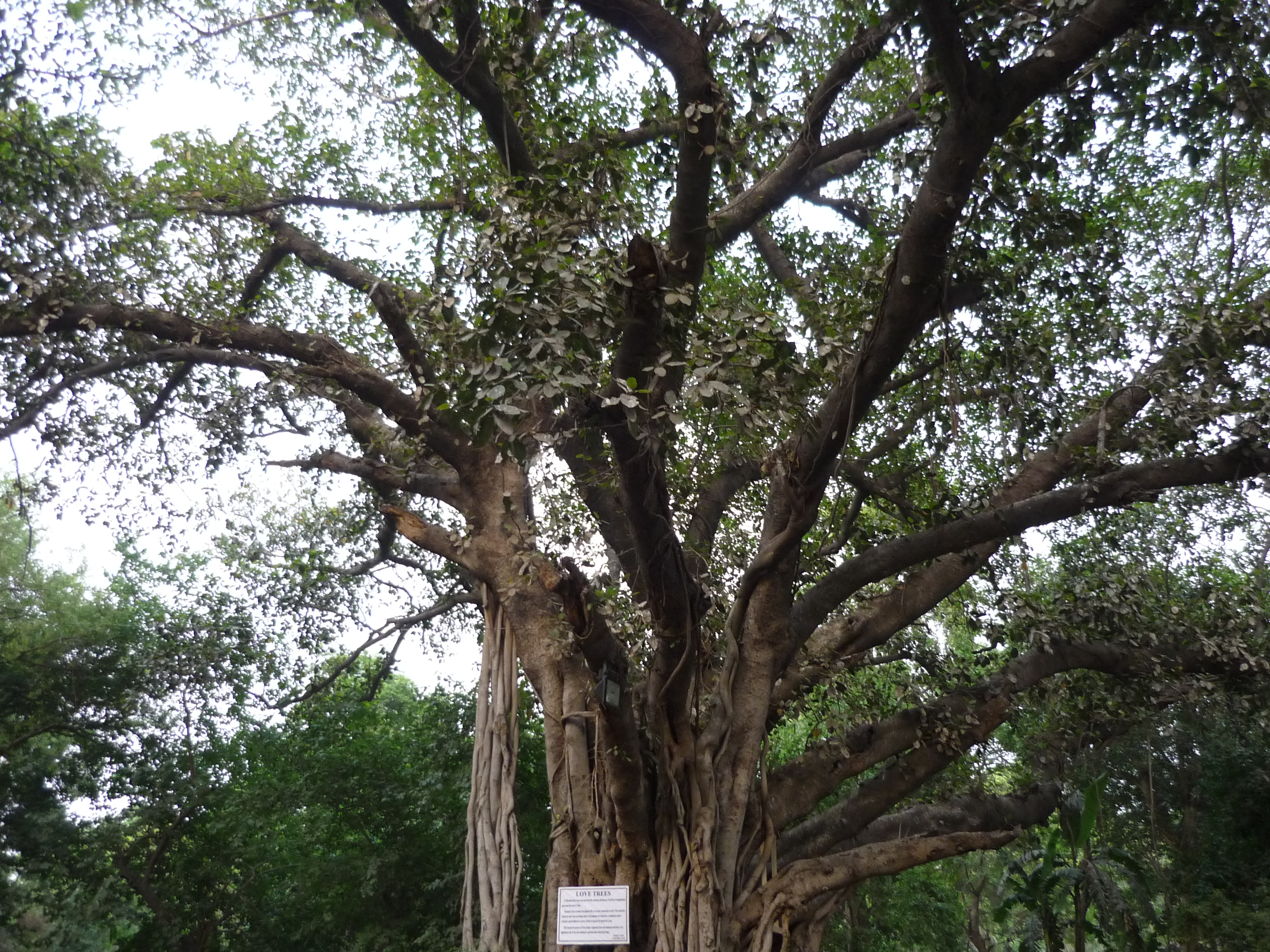
An old banyan (Ficus benghalensis)

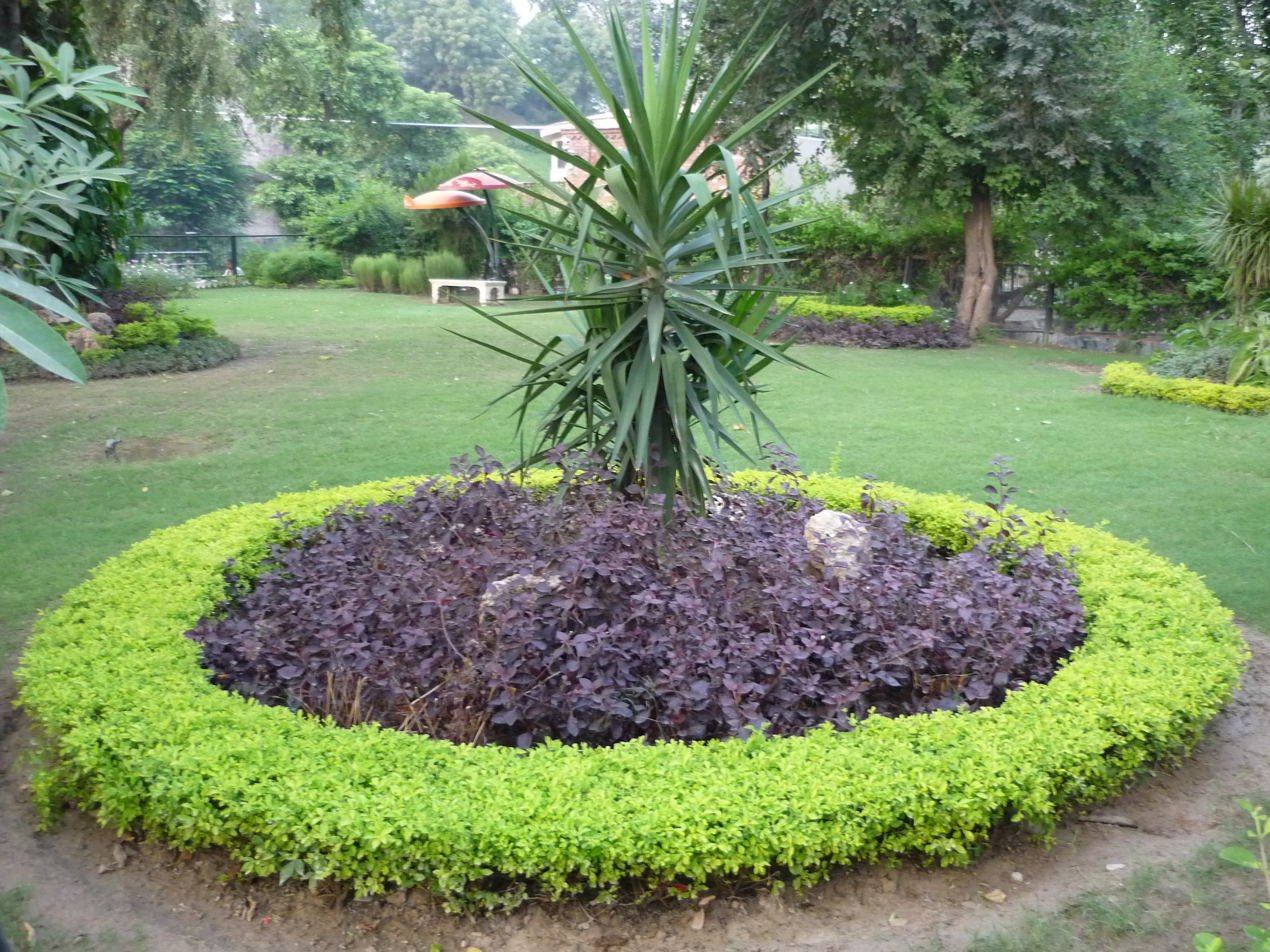
Another plantation

=== Safari park ===
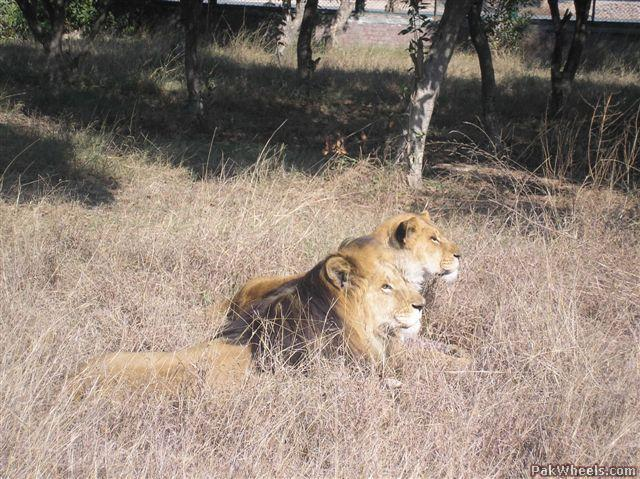
A pair of lions at Lahore Zoo Safari

Lahore Zoo Safari was opened on January 21, 2009, a renovation of Lahore Wildlife Park (also called Woodland Wildlife Park) which was established in 1982. The Safari Park is located near Raiwind Road about 30 km (19 mi) from the Lahore Zoo. The species housed here include Indian peafowl, Bengal tiger, common pheasant, emu, lion, mute swan, nilgai, ostrich and silver pheasant among a few others. The wildlife park is now considered to be an extension of Lahore Zoo.

The Government of Pakistan turned management of the wildlife park over to the Zoo Maintenance Committee headed by the chairman of the Punjab branch of the Wildlife & Parks department. Vice-chairman Tauqeer Shah said this transfer of control was due to poor previous management that was not working to improve the park. A ticket system was introduced in the wildlife park so that the Lahore Zoo Safari could become a semi-autonomous, self-financed organization.

== Species list ==
=== Aves ===
List of species at Lahore Zoo

Accipitriformes

- Black kite
- Common kestrel
- Golden eagle
- Steppe eagle
- White-eyed buzzard

Anseriformes

- Bar-headed goose
- Black swan
- Common shelduck
- Common teal
- Eurasian wigeon
- Gadwall
- Greater white-fronted goose
- Greylag goose (domestic goose)
- Mallard
- Muscovy duck
- Mute swan
- New Zealand scaup
- Red shoveler
- Ruddy shelduck
- Wood duck

Columbiformes

- Rock pigeon
  - Black Sherazi pigeon
  - Indian Fantail pigeon
- Western crowned pigeon

Galliformes

- Black partridge
- Chukar partridge
- Common pheasant
- Emerald peafowl
  hybrid of green peafowl and Indian peafowl
- Golden pheasant
  - Yellow pheasant (mutation)
- Green peafowl
- Grey francolin
- Grey partridge
- Indian peafowl
  - Black shouldered peafowl
  - Common blue peafowl
  - Pied peafowl
  - White peafowl
- Silver pheasant
- Swinhoe's pheasant
- Vulturine guineafowl
- Wild turkey

Gruiformes

- Demoiselle crane
- Eurasian coot
- Houbara bustard

Pelecaniformes

- Dalmatian pelican
- Great white pelican

Phoenicopteriformes

- Greater flamingo
- Lesser flamingo

Psittaciformes

- Grey parrot
- Alexandrine parakeet
- Blossom-headed parakeet
- Blue-and-yellow macaw
- Budgerigar
- Cape parrot
- Cockatiel
- Green-winged macaw
- Lilian's lovebird
- Panama amazon
- Rose-ringed parakeet
- Sulphur-crested cockatoo

Strigiformes

- Indian eagle-owl

Struthioniformes

- Emu
- Ostrich
- Southern cassowary

=== Mammals ===
List of species at Lahore Zoo

Artiodactyla

- Bactrian camel (1)
- Blackbuck
- Chinkara (Indian gazelle)
- Chital (axis deer) (7)
- Fallow deer
- Giraffe
- Hippopotamus (1)
- Hog deer
- Llama
- Guanaco
- Nilgai
- Ovis orientalis
  - Mouflon (O. orientalis orientalis)
  - Urial (O. orientalis vignei)
- Red deer
- Sambar
- Sika deer
- Wild boar

Carnivora

- Asian black bear (4)
- Brown bear
- Bengal tiger
- Cougar (puma) (2)
- Indian wolf (3)
- Jungle cat (1)
- Leopard (2)
- Lion (16)
- Smooth-coated otter (2)

Lagomorpha

- Domestic rabbit

Marsupials

- Red-necked wallaby

Perissodactyla

- Plains zebra
- White rhinoceros (1)

Primates

- Mantled guereza
- Tufted capuchin
- Chimpanzee (3)
- Olive baboon
- Rhesus macaque
- Vervet monkey

Proboscidea

- African bush elephant (1)

Rodentia

- Indian crested porcupine

=== Reptiles ===
List of species at Lahore Zoo

Crocodilia

- Mugger crocodile

Squamata

- Central Asian cobra (brown cobra)
- Common krait
- Diadem snake (rat snake)
- Enhydris - unidentified (water snake)
- Indian cobra (spectacled cobra)
- Indian python
- Indian sand boa
- Russell's viper
- Saw-scaled viper

Testudines

- Red-eared slider
- Spur-thighed tortoise

== Public service ==
Instruction boards, maps and sign boards are placed around the zoo for guidance and education. The zoo includes a mosque for Muslim prayers. In 2008, walk ways, the cafeteria, and public washrooms were renovated and umbrella benches, drinking water coolers and new waste bins were added as part of some basic infrastructure updates.

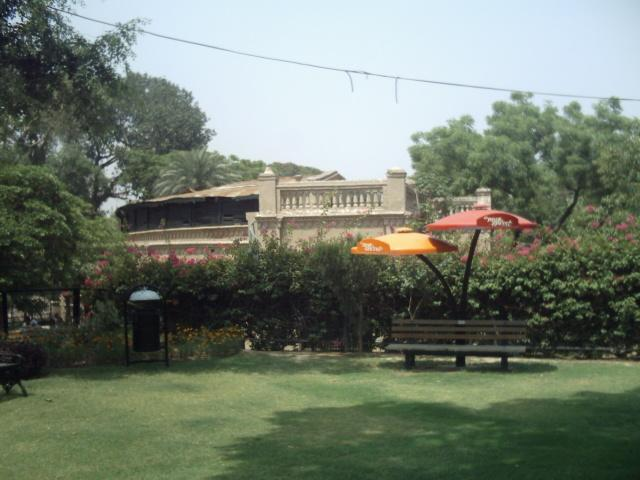
A shaded sitting area

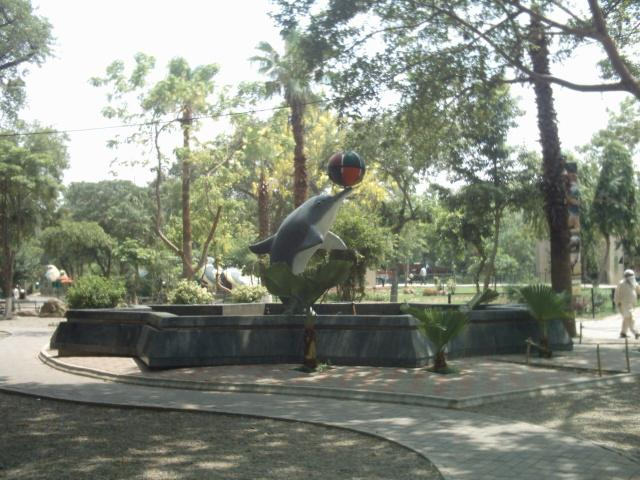
A dolphin sculpture

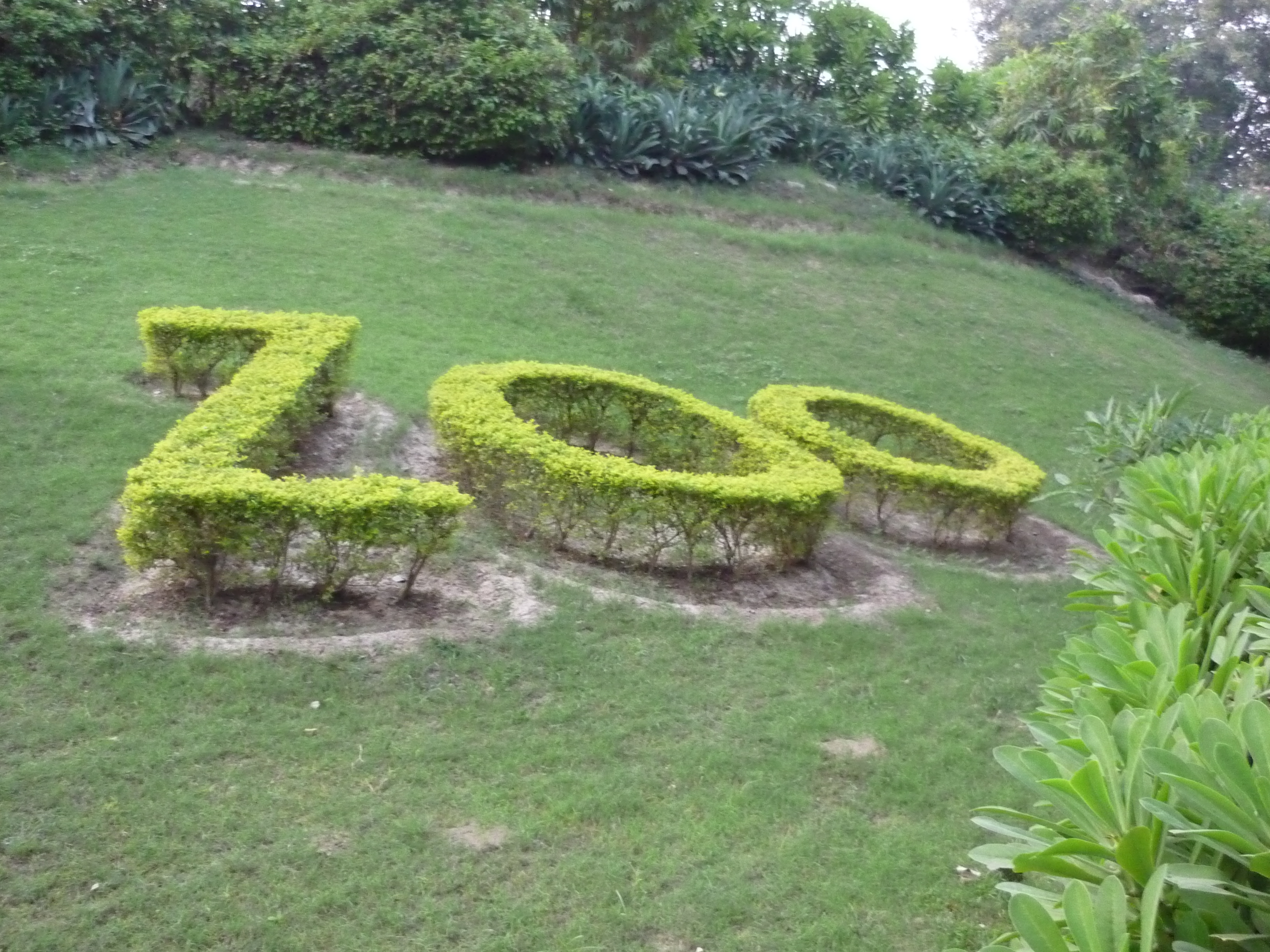
A plant decor

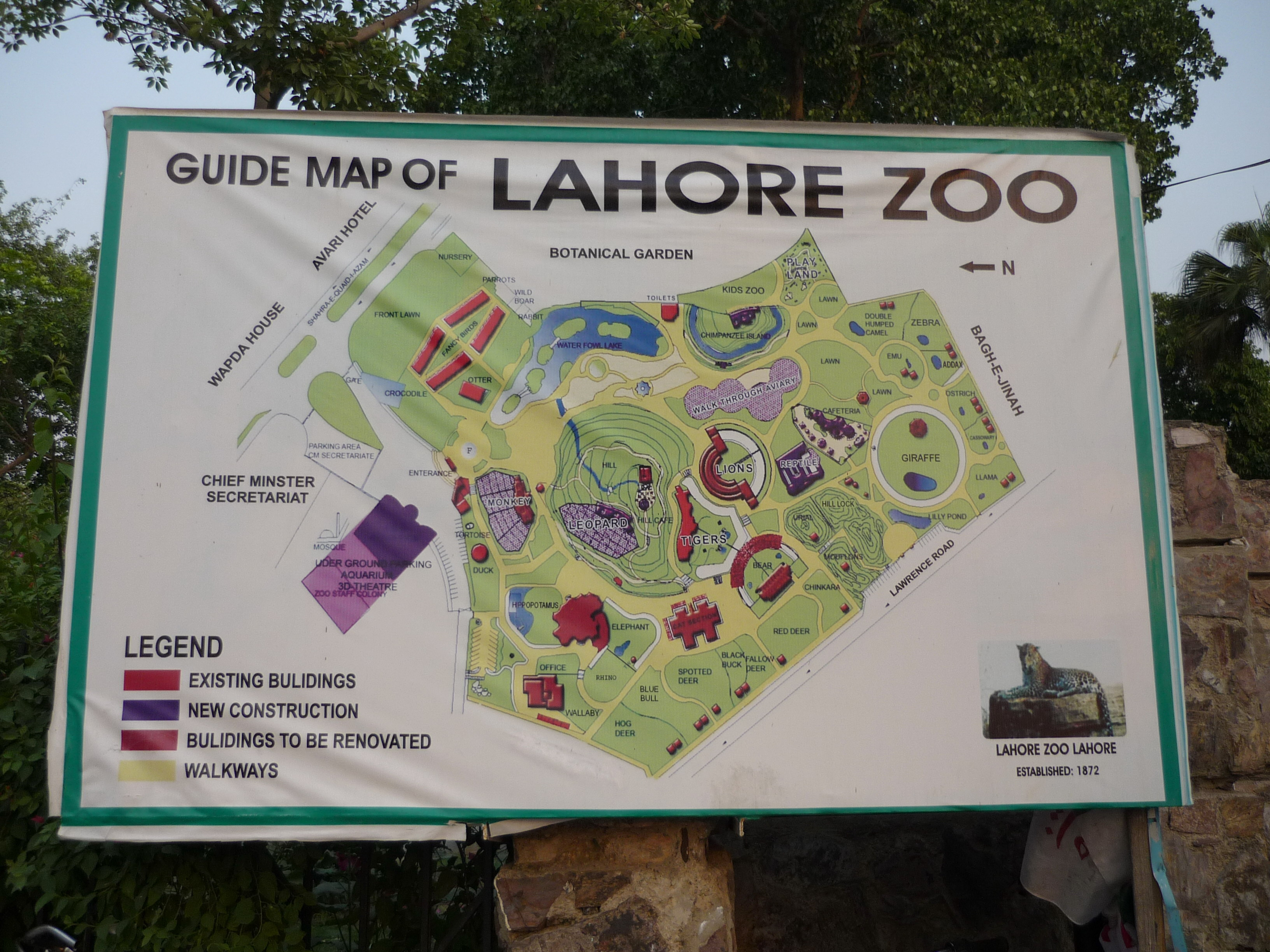
A zoo map

=== Recreation ===
Camel rides and electronic kiddy rides are available for children. Lahore Zoo also has plenty of areas for visitors to picnic. A waterfall was created for visitors, and statues of various animals have been placed within the boundaries of the zoo.

=== Education ===
The education officer of Lahore Zoo is Kiran Saleem. The zoo hosts guided tours for school groups, as well as placing information boards about the animals and plants around the zoo. A touch table has been set up to let children to touch animal parts like skins, horns, feathers and eggs that they cannot otherwise see or feel. The zoo has also prepared brochures and posters about endangered species in Pakistan like Ganges and Indus river dolphin.

On September 5, 2009, Lahore Zoo celebrated the International Vulture Awareness Day and distributed posters regarding the importance of vultures in ecosystems. Reasons of sharp decline of populations of Indian white-rumped vulture were made known to local people.

In 2010, Lahore Zoo celebrated events like World Environment Day on June 5 and World Animal Day on October 4. This particular and colorful event was organized by the students of Zoology department, University of the Punjab, Lahore. The students (BS.hons Batch 2010–14) participated actively to arrange for the event in the supervision of their course instructor, former Education officer of Lahore Zoo, Bushra Nisar Khan.

In November 2010, Lahore Zoo started its first publication, a quarterly newsletter. It is said to be the part of the education and awareness programme.

In 2024, Holoverse facility was launched for general public with the intention of public entertainment and education purposes. 3D iLLUMINATION was appointed to develop the state-of-the-art facility.

=== Research facilities ===
The Lahore Zoo, with the assistance of its education office in particular, provides research facilities and supports relevant studies at the zoo. Scores of students from University of Veterinary and Animal Sciences and University of the Punjab work in collaboration with Lahore Zoo to complete their research projects and internships. As a prime example, the zoo provided direct assistance to a research project with the kind approval of Director General Wildlife and Parks Department, Punjab. The study was conducted by a BS.Hons student of Department of Zoology, University of the Punjab. The researcher, Sana Ahmed, presented her synopsis as to study the public perception about the zoo and the role it plays to enhance the visitors' experience. The study included a survey from more than 200 zoo visitors, questioning them about different zoo facilities, animal species kept at zoo and about their experiences and suggestions. The study provided a useful insight to how visitors perceive the zoo. Likewise, it helped the zoo in shaping future strategies to design and launch interactive public awareness campaigns about ex-situ conservation. The research paper was presented in the National conference and training workshop of Wildlife and Aerobiology, held at University of the Punjab, Lahore. The researcher, first author of the paper (co-author of 3 other papers) got her paper publish in The Journal of Animal and Plant Sciences under the title, "The Study of Public Perception for Captive Animals at Lahore Zoo, Pakistan."

=== Gift shop ===
In 2005, a gift shop was opened in joint collaboration between Pakistan branch of WWF and the Lahore Zoo. Ali Bokhari, the marketing head of WWF-Pakistan, stated that the profit earned would be split in half between the Lahore Zoo and WWF-Pakistan. Lahore Zoo would make souvenirs from the profit which would be on sale at the shop, while the WWF would invest it on the conservation of nature in Pakistan. The products include shirts, mugs, plush toys, posters, caps and bags among many others.

== Breeding efforts ==
- Asian black bear: In September 2009, a rescued female was given to Lahore Zoo by World Wide Fund for Nature. Lahore Zoo was successful in breeding the species when twins were born in early January 2010. The cubs, however, went missing on 17 January.
- Chimpanzee: A pair (named 'Romeo', the male and 'Juliet', the female) were brought to the zoo in 1994. They gave birth to a male named 'Tinku' in April 2000, another female named 'Pinky' in 2004 and a female named 'Honey' in April 2005. In October 2004, the Wildlife Department of Pakistan told the Daily Times that the four-year-old 'Tinku' had died some time in early August from pneumonia. On September 17, 2008, Romeo died at the age of 21 from a prolonged illness.
- Hippopotamus: A six-year-old male hippopotamus was brought to the zoo on January 16, 1974. On July 11, 2006, zoo bought a six-year-old female to mate with the male that has been at the zoo for over three decades. An expert said that this was pointless because the male had passed its reproductive stage. Raja died on October 25, 2015.
- Gharial: In November 2004, Lahore Zoo exchanged animals with Karachi Zoo including a male gharial. Lahore Zoo already had three female gharials and with a male, it could initiate a conservation attempt. The male was transported by truck to the zoo, but died the day after it was transferred. Currently there are only two female gharials at the zoo.
- Leopard: On 18 January 2006, zoo officials said that a seven-year-old female wild leopard was caught at Muree and brought to Lahore Zoo for breeding. However, it died about a month later on 21 February because of nervousness. On 5 April 2009, it was reported that 3 leopards (black panthers; one male and two female) purchased in February 2009 had to be returned because they had become sick. Currently Lahore Zoo houses only two leopards.

== Plans ==
On December 8, 2010, it was announced that the administration of Lahore Zoo is planning to make Reema Khan, an actress, as the ambassador of wildlife in captivity. Current zoo director, Iqbal Khalid, told Dawn News that Khan will help create awareness among citizens about wildlife issues. It was also revealed, that Lahore Zoo will start renting exotic animals from other countries. This will give a chance to local people to learn more about different animals across the globe. Lahore Zoo plans to rent two giant pandas from People's Republic of China. "Once it gets a sponsor, the zoo administration will submit a request to the Chinese government for the animal, which is popular around the world. Chinese officials will visit the zoo to inspect housing and health facilities for pandas," said Khalid.

In September 2015, the Lahore Zoo administration announced plans to bring 19 new animals in order to maintain a healthy gene pool in the zoo. Zoo director Hassan Ali Sukhaira also stated that veterinary lab, with pathological and hematological labs, treatment rooms and an ICU, will be established at the zoo. The first of these new animals, a trio of giraffes, arrived at the zoo on 26 June 2018.

== Controversies ==
The plight of captive animals at Lahore Zoo, has been subject to criticism by local animal rights activists.

=== Safety and security concerns ===
On 21 November 1999, an Asian black bear killed an 18-month-old boy named Abdullah in the zoo. The child, who was with his parents, tried to shake hands with the caged animal. The bear pulled the boy into the cage and tore him apart. An angry crowd tried to kill the animal but the police intervened to bring the situation under control. Zoo officials blamed the parents for allowing the boy to touch the animal. On 8 January 2004, an attendant at the zoo was attacked by a red fox when its cage was left unlocked, causing a panic among visitors. On 9 April 2007, two stray dogs entered an Indian peafowl pen from a broken portion of a fence and managed to kill about 28 peafowl. This resulted in criticism as Indian peafowl is considered sacred in Indian subcontinent. On 10 May 2009, it was reported that a new born macaw was stolen from the zoo. The zoo director said that someone from the zoo staff must have been responsible. On 17 January 2010, two Asian black bear cubs went missing from the zoo.

=== Animal deaths ===
Lahore Zoo has been criticized for not having the level of medical facilities expected in a modern zoo. Zoo officials reported in April 2005 that three female black-footed gray langurs died due to cold weather the previous winter. In November 2005, a male mandrill and male puma died at the zoo. A female Asian black bear died in mid-February 2006. In September 2006, some animals at the zoo were diagnosed with tuberculosis, which can also be transmitted to humans, but early detection and treatment prevented an outbreak. In January 2009, a female giraffe was attacked by a plains zebra and died soon after due to injuries.

In October 2004 the Wildlife Department of Pakistan told the Daily Times that a four-year-old male chimpanzee had died in early August from pneumonia, but zoo management had not revealed this news to public immediately. In September 2008, another male chimpanzee died at the age of 21 from a prolonged unidentified illness.

Lahore Zoo received a pair of Bengal tigers from Belgium in 1992 to start their captive breeding program. In 1997, six Bengal tigers died from Trypanosomiasis at the zoo, and in 2006, four more became victims. In July 2007, two female Bengal tigers, one of which had given the zoo 19 cubs, died from same disease. In early May 2009, a 3-year-old female Bengal tiger died after a cesarean section to take out her dead babies. In April 2009, a Bengal tiger gave birth to four In July 2009, a lioness gave birth to two cubs but killed them by eating their heads. Director, Zafar Shah, said that the lioness had been killing her cubs for the last three years and is a victim of cannibalism - a mental disease found in 5-6% of lions worldwide. At Lahore Zoo, there have been many births of Bengal tiger cubs who are deformed and do not survive long. In late 2010, the officials showed concern for the issue of inbreeding that might be the reason behind these deaths.

In early November 2010, Lahore Zoo received 53 falcons which were being illegally transported to Qatar from Benazir Bhutto International Airport. 16 falcons died due to heat strokes and other reasons. In April 2011, the zoo officials returned the remaining falcons to the wildlife department to be set free so that they can migrate to colder regions.

=== Smuggling scandal ===
On 27 March 2009, two white Bengal tigers were brought into Pakistan from Indonesia without necessary import documents and sold to the Lahore Zoo. The sources said that trans-boundary movement of the rare and endangered species was controlled by the CITES and that a certificate of permission from CITES and permission from the Islamabad-based National Council for Conservation of Wildlife (NCCW) were both required before import of the animals. Lahore Zoo had neither. The director of the zoo, Yusuf Paul said the zoo had purchased two female white Bengal tigers from supplier Mohammad Afzal of a Lahore-based organisation, Animal World, for 7.6 million Pakistani rupees.

== See also ==
- List of zoos in Pakistan
- List of parks and gardens in Lahore
- List of parks and gardens in Pakistan
