= Saigon Zoo and Botanical Gardens =

Zoo in Ho Chi Minh City, Vietnam

- Thảo Cầm Viên Sài Gòn
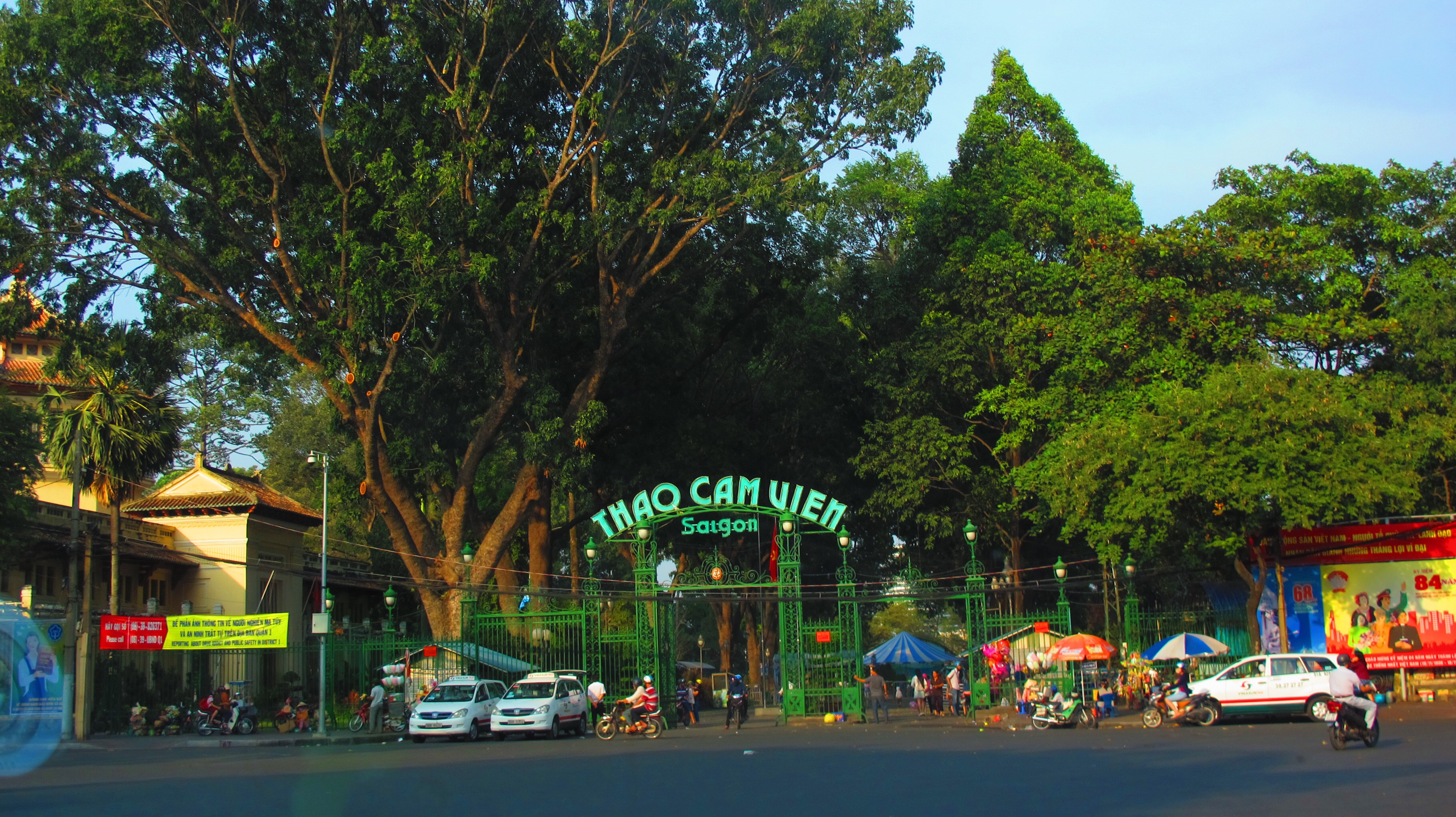
- Main entrance to the Saigon Zoo and Botanical Gardens
- Interactive map of Saigon Zoo and Botanical Gardens
- 10°47′17″N 106°42′17″E
- Date opened: 17 February 1869; 157 years ago
- Location: 2B Nguyễn Bỉnh Khiêm Street (Main Gate); No.1 Nguyễn Thị Minh Khai Street, District 1, Saigon, Ho Chi Minh City
- Land area: 20 hectares (49 acres)
- No. of animals: 2000
- No. of species: 120+
- Annual visitors: 1.8 million (2023)
- Memberships: SEAZA, IUCN, WAZA, Species360, Vietnam Zoo Association
- Owner: Saigon Zoo and Botanical Gardens Company Ltd.; Ho Chi Minh City People's Committee
- Public transit: L1 Ba Son station L3 Hoa Lư station, Thị Nghè station (proposed)
- Website: saigonzoo.net

The Saigon Zoo and Botanical Gardens (Vietnamese: Thảo Cầm Viên Sài Gòn, French: Jardin botanique et zoologique de Saïgon), or locally and colloquially known as The Zoo ("Sở Thú"), is Vietnam's oldest zoo and botanical garden. The Saigon Zoo and Botanical Gardens was commissioned by Admiral Pierre-Paul de La Grandière in 1864, and was opened to the public in 1869, making it one of the world's oldest continuously operating zoos.

The Botanical Gardens were founded in 1864 by Jean Baptiste Louis Pierre, which he directed until 1877.

Located on Nguyễn Bỉnh Khiêm Street and the northeast end of Lê Duẩn Boulevard in District 1, Ho Chi Minh City, it is home to over a hundred species of mammals, reptiles and birds, as well as many rare orchids and ornamental plants. Also within the grounds is the Ho Chi Minh City Museum of History, housing some 25,000 artifacts of history, culture and ethnography of South Vietnam. The grounds also include the Temple of Hùng King (formerly a monument to Indochinese soldiers who died for France during World War I). Other parts of the zoo are divided into animal and plant conservation areas, an orchid garden, and an amusement park.

== History ==
On March 23, 1864, Admiral Pierre-Paul de La Grandière, commander of French forces in Cochinchina, commissioned the building of a zoo in Saigon. Malacologist Louis Germain was named the director of the project on March 28, 1865. Construction started on 12 hectares (30 acres) northeast of Thị Nghè Canal near the Saigon River mouth, and the zoo occupied 20 hectares (49 acres) by the end of 1865 in the southern bank of the channel. On February 17, 1869, the zoo opened to the public, and today the Saigon Zoo is one of the oldest continuously operating zoos in the world.

The Saigon Zoo has undergone many changes over the years. In 1927, a bridge across Thị Nghè Canal was built to connect sections of the zoo. In 1985, a stone jetty was built, and electrical wiring was added to improve the zoo. In 1989 the facilities received many improvements to make the environment more suitable for its resident population. In 1990, the Saigon Zoo and Botanical Garden was recognized as a member of the South East Asian Zoos Association. In 1993, the zoo director proposed a long-term plan to improve the quality of management, housing, and care of the animals. That plan came to a close in 2003. The Saigon Zoo and Botanical Gardens is now the largest zoo and botanical garden in Vietnam.

=== Renovations ===
- 1864, established with the name "Vườn Bách Thảo" (Botanical Garden).
- 1924 - 1927, build habitats for monkeys and tigers.
- 1956: Renamed to "Thảo Cầm Viên Sài Gòn".
- 1984: New waterwork system, as well as fencing on Nguyễn Bỉnh Khiem Street.
- Since 1990: The zoo is expanded from 0.85 hectare to 2.5 hectare in 2000.
- 2017: Open of Fauna and Flora Museum.

== Features ==
The Saigon Zoo and Botanical Garden contains 590 animals of 125 species and 1,830 trees and plants of 260 species, some of which are over 100 years old. This includes 20 species of orchid, 32 species of cactus and 34 species of bonsai. The Saigon Zoo and Botanical Garden is divided into an animal conservation area, a plant conservation area, an orchid garden and an amusement park.

The botanical garden contains many species of rare and valuable plants, some of which are not native to Vietnam. There are species of cacti, ferns and plants that have been imported from Africa and America. The zoo has many kinds of mammals, reptiles, and birds such as: monkeys, giraffes, white Bengal tigers, Clouded Leopards, African lions, gibbons, turtles and snakes. Besides native animal species, there are also many exotic species, some of which are seen in Vietnam for the first time, such as: Hippopotamus amphibius, Choeropsis liberiensis, Panthera onca, Struthio camelus, Phoenicopterus ruber.

The Saigon Zoo and Botanical Garden contains two noteworthy buildings: a temple to the Hung Kings, originally built as a monument to Indochinese soldiers who died for France during World War I; and the Museum of Vietnamese History. The museum is split into two sections: a 15 room-area displaying items from the beginning of Vietnam to 1930, and a 6 room-area displaying artifacts from the culture and history of South Vietnam. Outside of the museum there is a large yard that displays the weapons of France, used during Vietnam's French colonial era. The museum also contains approximately 25,000 documents of history, culture and ethnography. The zoo employs approximately 1,000 workers, and estimates that it attracts over two million visitors each year.

- Reptile Areas

The zoo has one Reptile House, located near the gate on Nguyen Thi Minh Khai street. The place houses many species of pythons, snakes, tortoise, iguanas. The zoo also has a crocodile lake (named Crocodile Garden) on the east side of the zoo. The area houses many crocodiles like Siamese crocodiles and Saltwater crocodiles.

- Herbivore Area

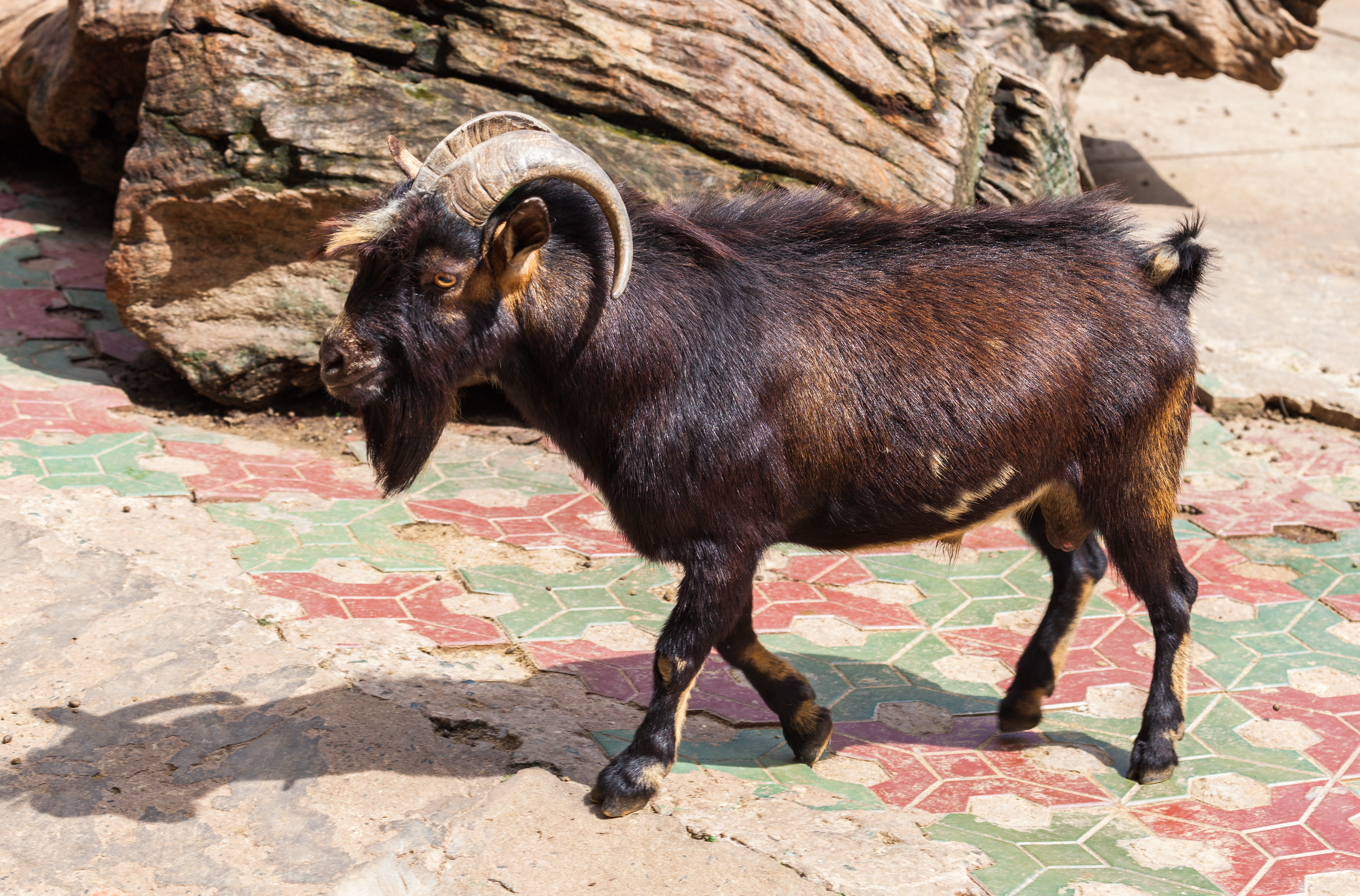
Children Zoo in Saigon Zoo

The Herbivore Area located on the north side of the zoo, between Thi Nghe channel and the waterwork inside the zoo. The area include the habitats of Common Eland, Blue wildebeest, and some other antelopes.

- Small Carnivore Area

The Small Carnivores exhibit features the raccoon, the binturong, fishing cats, asian golden cat, clouded leopards, and some feline juveniles and civets.

- Bird Areas

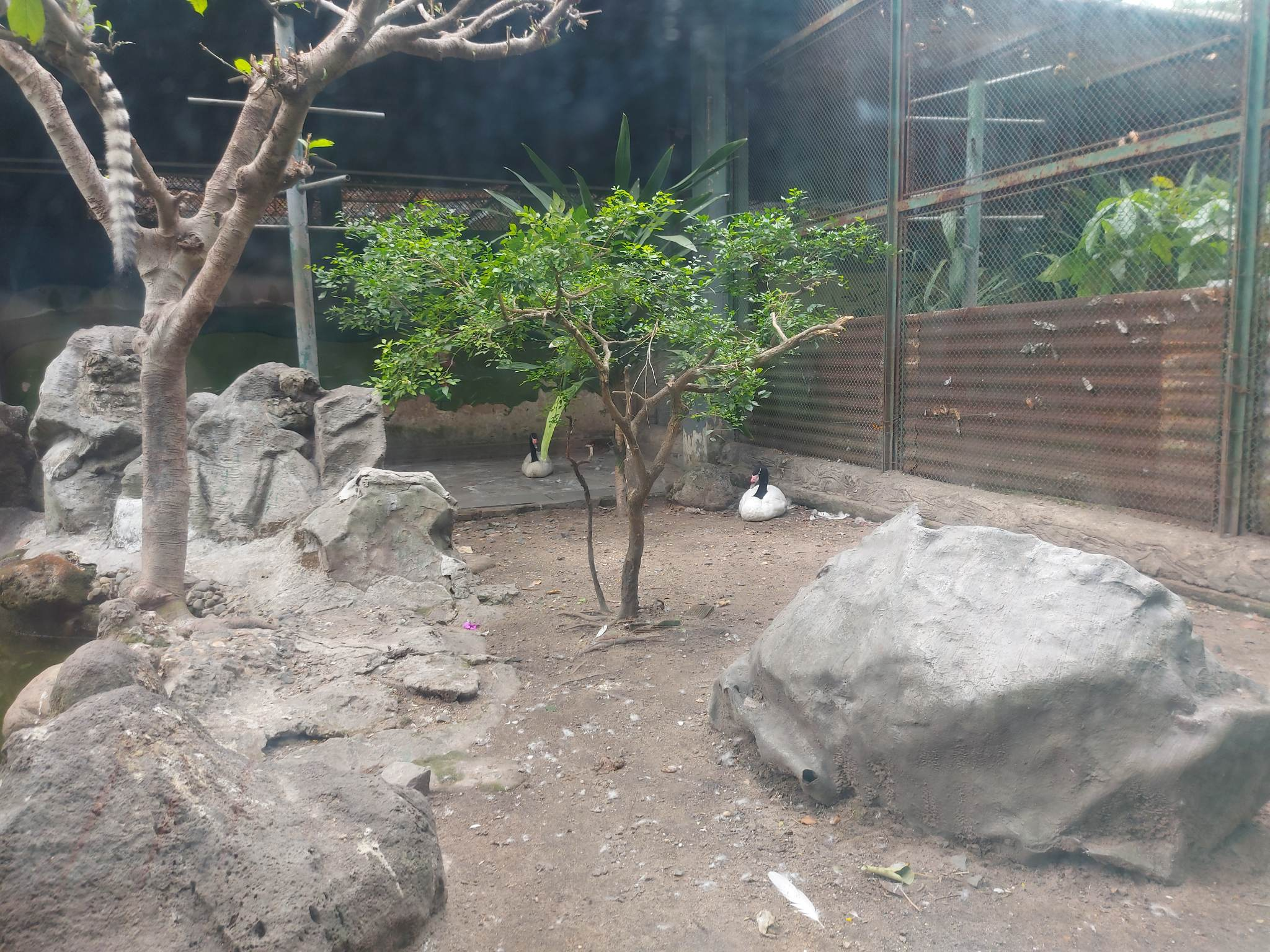
A habitat in the Saigon Zoo.

The zoo has many bird areas, located all over the zoo. Though, notably, their habitats are in different conditions. The Lotus Island on the southern area, and the Leptoptilos area are notably the 2 truly free roaming habitats for the birds. The lakes contain different types of lotuses and fish species. Some notable animals include: flamingoes, Indian peafowl, Green peafowl, Vietnamese crested argus, Grey crowned crane, Mandarin ducks...

- Others

The zoo also house many other animals and plants. Notably, they don't seem to arrange in any order. White Bengal tigers, douc langurs, squirrel monkeys, Ring-tailed lemurs, Gibbons, Chimpanzees, one Orangutan, ...

=== Fauna and Flora Museum ===
Within the Zoo is the Fauna and Flora Museum. The museum stores many Zoological specimen and Herbarium, including wet specimen, skeletal specimen and taxidermy.

== Conservation and education ==
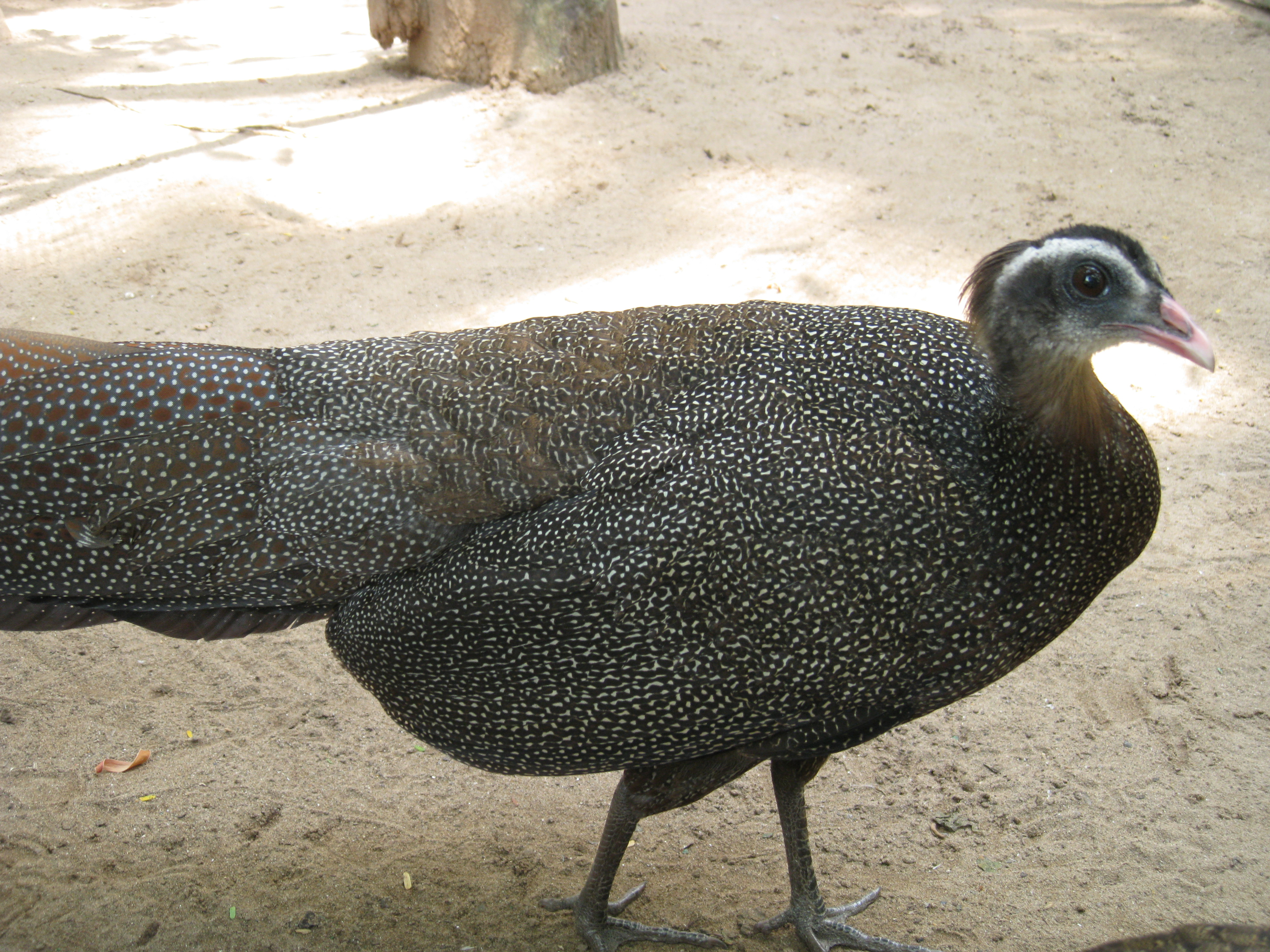
A crested argus in Saigon Zoo

The main purpose of the Saigon Zoo and Botanical Garden is to educate the public and protect endangered animals and plants. One of many programs the zoo participates in to protect endangered species is one to breed animals in captivity, the goal being to replenish their populations. The Saigon Zoo is currently the only zoo in the world that has successfully bred Vietnamese crested argus pheasants in captivity.

In addition to conservation, in 1999 the zoo's conservation education department created a plan to educate the public about how to protect animals and plants. Each year, 3,200 students visit the zoo and listen to an hour-long lecture and watch a 30-minute film about animal and plant conservation. It is also a place for people from all over the world to study the fauna and flora of Southeast Asia.

== See also ==
- List of botanical gardens
- List of botanical gardens in Vietnam
- List of zoos in Asia
- https://www.patrimoine.asso.fr/saigon-ho-chi-minh-ville-les-160-ans-du-jardin-botanique-160-nam-thao-cam-vien-saigon/
