= River terrapin =

River terrapin may refer to:

- Northern river terrapin (Batagur baska)
- Southern river terrapin (Batagur affinis)
