= Zoo Outreach Organisation =

Indian zoo association

Zoo Outreach Organisation (ZOO), India started off as an NGO primarily focusing on training zoo staff and bettering the circumstances of captive animals in Indian zoos. It has since evolved into an overall nature and wildlife conservation NGO, and is an affiliate member of the World Association of Zoos and Aquariums (WAZA).

Wildlife Information Liaison Development, ZOO's sister organization, publishes the Journal of Threatened Taxa; ZOO hosts the journal's website.

== See also ==
- List of zoo associations
