= List of zoos in Canada =

Most zoos in Canada are committed to education, science and conservation.

For aquariums, see List of aquaria in Canada.

== Alberta ==
- Edmonton Valley Zoo - Edmonton
- Discovery Wildlife Park - Innisfail
- Wilder Institute/Calgary Zoo - Calgary

== British Columbia ==
- British Columbia Wildlife Park - Kamloops
- Greater Vancouver Zoo - Aldergrove
- Victoria Bug Zoo - Victoria
- Victoria Butterfly Gardens - Brentwood Bay

== Manitoba ==
- Assiniboine Park Zoo - Winnipeg
- Westman Reptile Gardens - Douglas

== New Brunswick ==
- Magnetic Hill Zoo - Moncton

== Nova Scotia ==
- Shubenacadie Wildlife Park - Shubenacadie
- Two Rivers Wildlife Park - Huntington
- Oulton Meats Martock Glen Farm Agrizoo - Martock

== Ontario ==
- African Lion Safari - Hamilton
- Bird Kingdom - Niagara Falls
- Cochrane Polar Bear Habitat, Cochrane
- Colasanti's Tropical Gardens - Kingsville
- Elmvale Jungle Zoo - Elmvale
- Greenview Aviaries Park & Zoo - Chatham-Kent, Ontario
- High Park Zoo - Toronto
- Indian River Reptile and Dinosaur Park - Indian River
- Jungle Cat World - Orono
- Little Ray’s Reptile Zoo, Ottawa
- Oshawa Zoo and Fun Farm - Oshawa
- Papanack Park Zoo - Wendover
- Reptilia - Vaughan and Whitby
- Riverdale Farm - Toronto
- Riverview Park & Zoo - Peterborough
- Saunders Country Critters - Kemptville
- Safari Niagara - Stevensville
- Toronto Zoo - Toronto
- Twin Valley zoo - Brant
- Turda Farms - Mono
- West Perth Animal Park - Mitchell

== Quebec ==
- Bioparc de la Gaspésie - Bonaventure
- Ecomuseum Zoo - Montreal
- Familizoo - Saint-Calixte
- Granby Zoo - Granby
- Miller Zoo - Frampton
- Montreal Biodome - Montreal
- Montreal Insectarium - Montreal
- Parc Omega, Notre-Dame-de-Bonsecours
- Parc Safari - Hemmingford
- Zoo Animalia - Saint-Édouard-de-Maskinongé
- Zoo de Falardeau - Saint-David-de-Falardeau
- Zoo Sauvage de St-Félicien - Saint-Félicien

== Saskatchewan ==
- Forestry Farm Park and Zoo, Saskatoon

== Closed ==
=== British Columbia ===
- Okanagan Game Farm - Kaleden (opened 1967, closed 1999)
- Stanley Park Zoo - Stanley Park (closed 1994)

=== New Brunswick ===
- Cherry Brook Zoo - Saint John (opened 1974, closed 2020)

=== Nova Scotia ===
- Downs' Zoological Gardens - Fairview (closed 1872)
- Maritime Reptile Zoo - Dartmouth (opened 2012, closed 2015)
- Oaklawn Farm Zoo - Aylesford (closed 2024)
- Upper Clements Wildlife Park - Upper Clements (closed 2007)

=== Ontario ===
- Bowmanville Zoo - Clarington (opened 1919, closed in 2016)
- Marineland, Niagara Falls (opened 1961, closed 2024)

=== Quebec ===
- Jardin Zoologique du Québec - Quebec City (opened 1931, closed 2006)

=== Saskatchewan ===
- Moose Jaw Wild Animal Park - Moose Jaw (opened 1929, closed 1995)

== See also ==
- List of CAZA member zoos and aquariums
- List of WAZA member zoos and aquariums
- List of zoos
