= Interstate 355 =

Highway in Illinois

Interstate 355
- Veterans Memorial Tollway
- I-355 highlighted in red

Route information
- Auxiliary route of I-55
- Maintained by ISTHA and IDOT
- Length: 32.5 mi (Note: I-355 originally ran 20.01 miles (32.20 km) from I-55 to I-290, according to Illinois' 2005 GIS data. The southern extension added 12.5 miles (20.1 km) to this length, according to the Illinois State Toll Highway Authority.) (52.3 km)
- Existed: December 24, 1989–present
- History: Extended to I-80 on November 11, 2007
- NHS: Entire route

Major junctions
- South end: I-80 in New Lenox
- US 6 in New Lenox; I-55 in Bolingbrook; US 34 in Downers Grove; I-88 Toll / IL 110 (CKC) in Downers Grove; US 20 in Addison
- North end: I-290 in Itasca

Location
- Country: United States
- State: Illinois
- Counties: Will, Cook, DuPage

Highway system
- Interstate Highway System; Main; Auxiliary; Suffixed; Business; Future; Illinois State Highway System; Interstate; US; State; Tollways; Scenic
← IL 351	→ IL 390

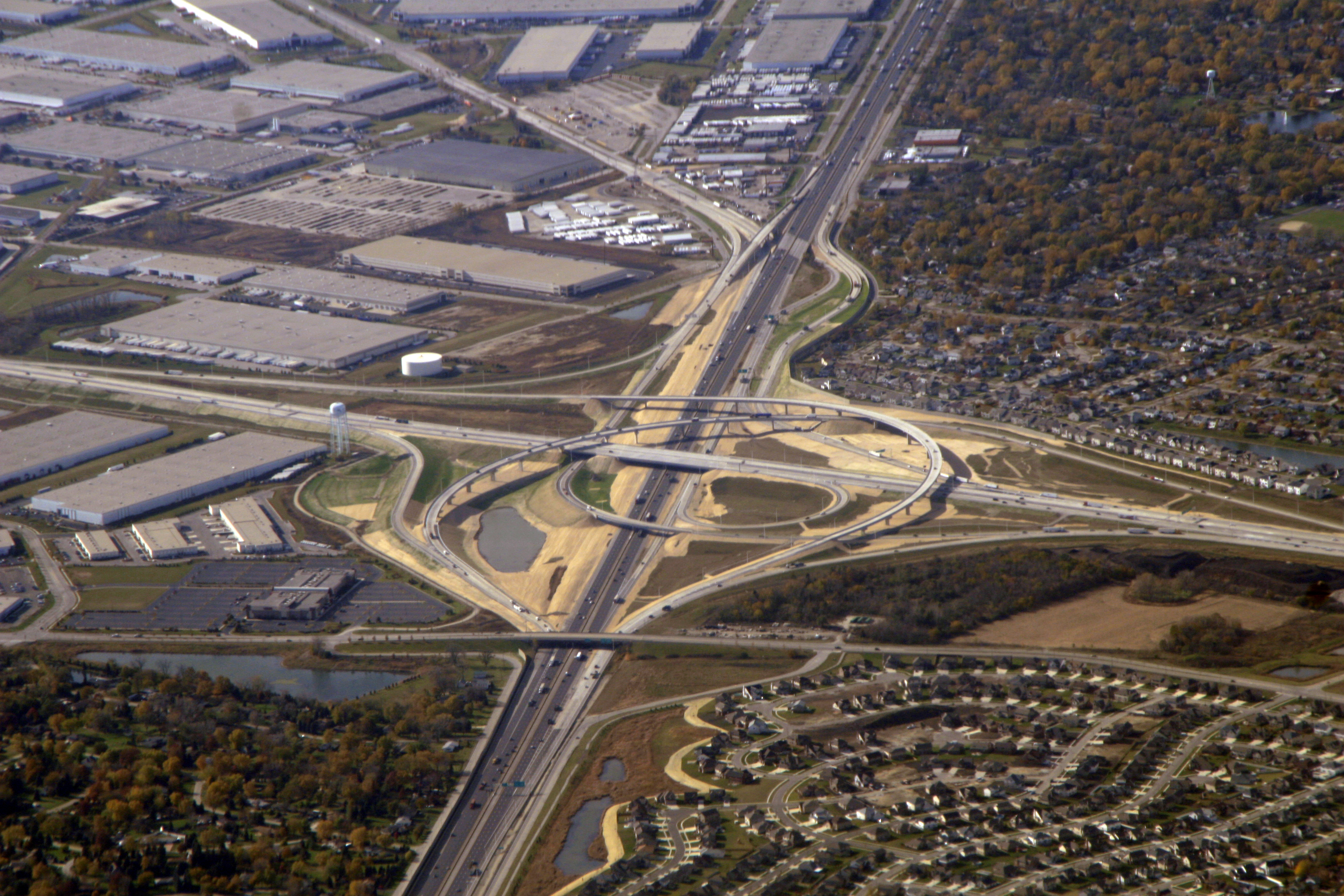
Interchange with I-55 in Bolingbrook, formerly the southern terminus of I-355

Interstate 355 (I-355), also known as the Veterans Memorial Tollway, is an Interstate Highway and tollway in the western and southwest suburbs of Chicago in the U.S. state of Illinois. Like most other toll roads in the northeastern portion of the state, I-355 is maintained by the Illinois State Toll Highway Authority (ISTHA). I-355 runs from I-80 in New Lenox north to I-290 in Itasca, a distance of 32.5 miles (52.3 km). With the exception of a four-mile (6.4 km) expansion in 2009, from U.S. Route 34 (US 34, Ogden Avenue) to 75th Street, the highway is six lanes wide for its entire length.

The tollway authority opened I-355 as the North–South Tollway in 1989 to ease congestion on Illinois Route 53 (IL 53), a parallel two-lane state highway in central DuPage County. Initially, I-355 ran from I-55 north to I-290. The new highway helped cut travel times for commuters traveling north and south in the county. According to commercial real estate developers at the time, the new tollway also opened the western suburbs of Chicago to commercial and industrial development.

On November 11, 2007, the tollway authority opened a southern extension of I-355, which runs 12.5 miles (20.1 km) between I-55 and I-80. The extension was routed through Will County and a small portion of Cook County, which together formed one of Illinois' fastest-growing regions at the time. The tollway authority expected the extension to cut travel times in the region by 20 percent. Upon the extension's opening, the tollway authority changed the name of the tollway to "Veterans Memorial Tollway".

== History ==
=== Early history ===
From 1963 to 1970, the Illinois Department of Transportation (IDOT) planned and built a new expressway north from Army Trail Road through Schaumburg to the Northwest Tollway (now the Jane Addams Memorial Tollway). After its completion, IDOT rerouted IL 53 onto this new expressway from Rohlwing Road. (Note: The 2006 National Bridge Inventory database shows the IL 19 bridge over I-290 dated to 1971. The I-290 bridge over now I-355, and I-355 bridge over US 20 are dated to 1970.)

The original alignment of I-355 was defined in the Chicago Area Transportation Study (abbreviated CATS) Transportation Plan of April 1962. The plan called for a supplemental system of limited-access expressways to be built in the Chicago metropolitan area by 1980, and defined corridors where the expressways were to be located. Most of these corridors, including the Des Plaines River expressway, the Crosstown Expressway running north–south along the west side of Chicago, and most of a proposed northern extension of IL 53 were scrapped because of intense local opposition.

Initially, state and county officials anticipated building a freeway for the expressway south of Army Trail Road, similar to the existing freeway north of Army Trail Road. In 1979, Chicago mayor Jane Byrne canceled plans for the proposed Crosstown Expressway. Following the move, Congress gave the rights to half of the $200 million (equivalent to $695 million in 2024) that had been earmarked for the Crosstown Expressway to DuPage County. However, county officials found this amount insufficient for construction of the new freeway. The officials then handed authority for the project over to the tollway authority, and spent the money on other projects in the county.

In June 1984, Republican minority leader of the Illinois House of Representatives James "Pate" Philip helped push through legislation authorizing the construction of the tollway, then referred to as simply the DuPage Tollway. Officials at the Morton Arboretum, one of the nation's premier woodland research centers, promptly filed a federal lawsuit to block construction of the tollway. They also promised to prevent the tollway authority from obtaining environmental approval from federal officials.

In April 1985, the two agencies came to an agreement regarding construction of the new tollway. To protect the arboretum from salt spray and other pollutants caused by cars on the tollway, the tollway authority agreed to build I-355 below grade around the perimeter of the arboretum. The tollway authority would build a water collection system to divert runoff from the arboretum. In addition, they would build earthen berms along the new road, preventing salt spray from damaging arboretum plants. In exchange, the DuPage County Forest Preserve District agreed to a 99-year lease providing 189 acres (0.76 km^{2}) of its land to the arboretum for the development of an "urban vegetation laboratory". Under the agreement, Morton Arboretum agreed to charge DuPage County residents lower admissions one day of the week, build a bicycle path connecting the arboretum to nearby forest preserves, and begin a joint clean-streams program to improve the water quality of DuPage County's lakes and streams. In January 1986, the tollway paid out $2.5 million (equivalent to $6.05 million in 2024) to a trust fund as a part of the settlement to help finance the arboretum's new programs.

The U.S. Army Corps of Engineers released a preliminary environmental impact statement on March 13, 1986. At a public hearing a month later, arboretum executives and Woodridge officials strongly criticized the report as "fatally flawed" and a repeat of tollway-provided research, including typographical errors. The opposition also cited outdated and inaccurate data regarding wetlands replacement, salt dispersion, and the lack of compensation to residents for lowered property values. The tollway authority agreed to run the road below-grade at 75th Street instead of as a 28-foot-high (8.5 m) elevated highway. In addition, they agreed to spend an extra $1 million (equivalent to $2.42 million in 2024) on the redesigned elevation and interchange.

The Corps of Engineers issued a permit for the tollway on October 8, 1986, rejecting last-minute concerns from the Sierra Club to reroute the toll road around sections of Churchill Woods Prairie, between Glen Ellyn and Lombard. The permit allowed the first two earth moving contracts issued by the tollway authority to move forward. The tollway authority put the total cost of 17.7 miles (28.5 km) of new pavement at $450 million (equivalent to $1.06 billion in 2024). Of the total cost, $325 million (equivalent to $768 million in 2024) was allocated for construction, $30 million (equivalent to $70.9 million in 2024) to alleviating environmental concerns, including moving and enlarging 117 acres (0.47 km^{2}) of wetlands, and $30 million (equivalent to $70.9 million in 2024) for utility relocation. Work in 1987 consisted primarily of excavation, embankment building and land acquisition.

Because of problems with pavement on other roads in the system and anticipation of heavy traffic on the new Interstate, the tollway authority decided to pave I-355 with pavement expected to last 20 years. Construction workers laid concrete on the tollway to a thickness of 12 inches (30 cm) over an 8-inch (20 cm) sub-base. The new pavement also incorporated fly ash and less cement, allowing the pavement to achieve maximum strength faster than pure concrete.

One of the last issues settled prior to the opening of the tollway was the highway's number. Originally, tollway officials designated the new road I-355. Early in 1988, however, the tollway administration received a letter from the Federal Highway Administration (FHWA) indicating that the highway should be designated as Interstate 455. FHWA policy at the time dictated that auxiliary Interstate routes that join two other Interstate Highways should start with an even number. IDOT argued the highway more closely resembles a spur from I-55. Ultimately, the tollway authority kept the I-355 designation.

Governor James R. Thompson and U.S. Secretary of Transportation Samuel K. Skinner dedicated the North–South Tollway on December 22, 1989. When it opened, officials estimated travel times from Schaumburg to Oak Brook would be reduced from 55 minutes to 34 minutes, and from Wheaton to Darien from 60 to 34 minutes. Tollway officials also estimated that 200,000 cars per day would use I-355. This figure has since been shown to be slightly optimistic, with maximum average daily traffic values approaching 170,200 only at the northern end of the Interstate. The initial length of I-355 was 20.01 miles (32.20 km) from I-55 north to I-290.

=== Opening ===
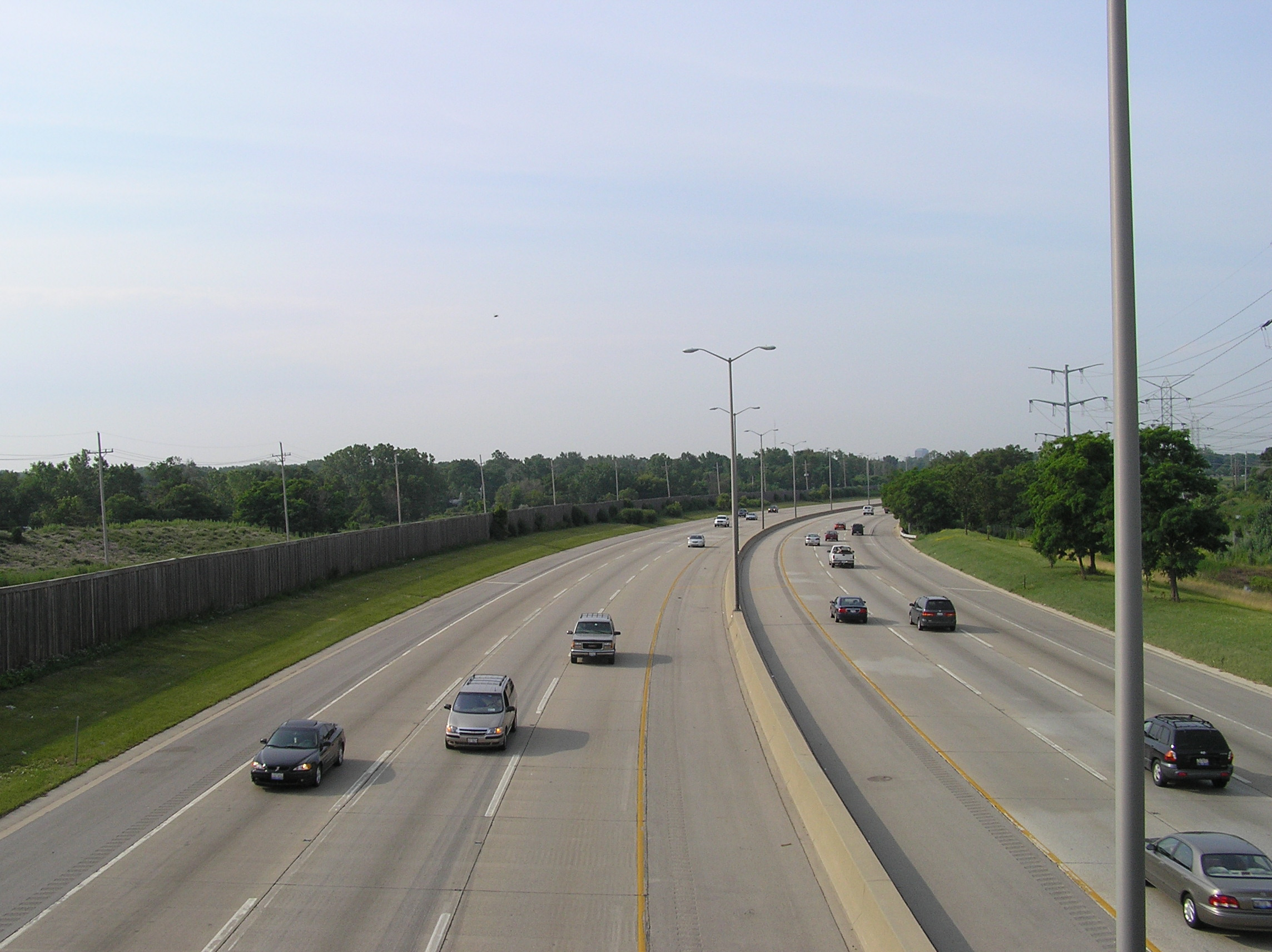
I-355 at the Illinois Prairie Path, looking south towards Downers Grove in the distance

I-355 opened at the stroke of midnight on December 24, 1989. As a Christmas gift, the first two days of operation were free. Because of lower traffic counts at the north and south ends of the highway and lack of construction money, tollway officials built the road with four lanes from North Avenue (IL 64) to the Ronald Reagan Memorial Tollway (I-88) on the north end, and around I-55 on the south end. As early as 1991, tollway officials had drawn up plans to widen the highway to three lanes in each direction. Widening from North Avenue to Butterfield Road (IL 56) took place in 1995. The old lines marking the former shoulder can still be seen in the right lane as a result of the tollway authority's attempt to grind them away.

After the new road opened, congestion decreased considerably on nearby north–south arteries. The DuPage County Division of Transportation calculated that congestion had decreased on IL 53 by 20%, and the volume of cars on nearby north–south roads IL 53, IL 59 and IL 83 had decreased. On IL 53 between Ogden Avenue and Roosevelt Road, traffic counts sank from 21,400 to 11,800 vehicles per day. In addition, traffic on the exit ramp from the Tri-State Tollway (I-294) to I-55 dropped 10 percent in 12 months. Drivers also reported decreases in travel time from one end of the county to the other of up to 40 minutes. However, the opening of the tollway also greatly increased congestion on I-290 near the northern terminus. A construction project in the summer months of 1990 widened I-290 just north of the tollway, at a cost of $2–2.5 million (equivalent to $42.3 million–52.9 million in 2024).

In spite of the apparent success of the tollway opening, traffic counts and projected toll revenues were initially lower than projected, with an estimated 65,000 motorists per day traveling along the tollway, generating $55,000–65,000 (equivalent to $116,000–138,000 in 2024) in daily toll revenues. In addition, a spate of lawsuits were filed regarding the payment of contractors and subcontractors. Numerous liens filed by subcontractors against the tollway were settled in June, 1990 at a cost of $10.1 million (equivalent to $21.4 million in 2024). The tollway authority released an additional $1 million (equivalent to $2 million in 2024) in May 1992 to further settle claims made by the general contractor, entering arbitration soon afterwards to settle another $1.6–27 million (equivalent to $3.2 million–54 million in 2024) the contractor claimed it was owed. By 2005, average annual daily traffic values had risen to a range of 77,400 to 170,200 vehicles per day.

As early as 1989, the tollway authority had discussed implementing automatic toll collection across the entire system to relieve congestion caused by traffic stopping at mainline toll barriers. The tollway authority began testing I-Pass, the tollway system's electronic payment method, on the entire stretch of I-355 in 1993 at various tollbooths; by September 1994, every plaza on I-355 accepted I-Pass. By 1998, the tollway authority had installed dedicated I-Pass lanes (lanes specifically set aside for electronic toll collections) at both mainline toll barriers. In 1999, I-355 became the first tollway to receive I-Pass Express Lanes (also known as open road tolling, or ORT). With the installation of the express lanes, vehicles with I-Pass could be tolled at highway speeds of 55 miles per hour (89 km/h). In 2005, the tollway authority widened the express lanes from two lanes to three lanes in each direction. This allowed the number of express lanes to match the number of travel lanes on the tollway.

Unlike the other tollways in the tollway system at the time, there were no oases on the Veterans Memorial Tollway when it was opened. This is primarily due to the widespread access to food and fuel throughout the western suburbs when construction began in the late 1980s. When the southern extension was opened in Will County in 2007, that segment of road also did not have any oases.

=== Southern extension ===
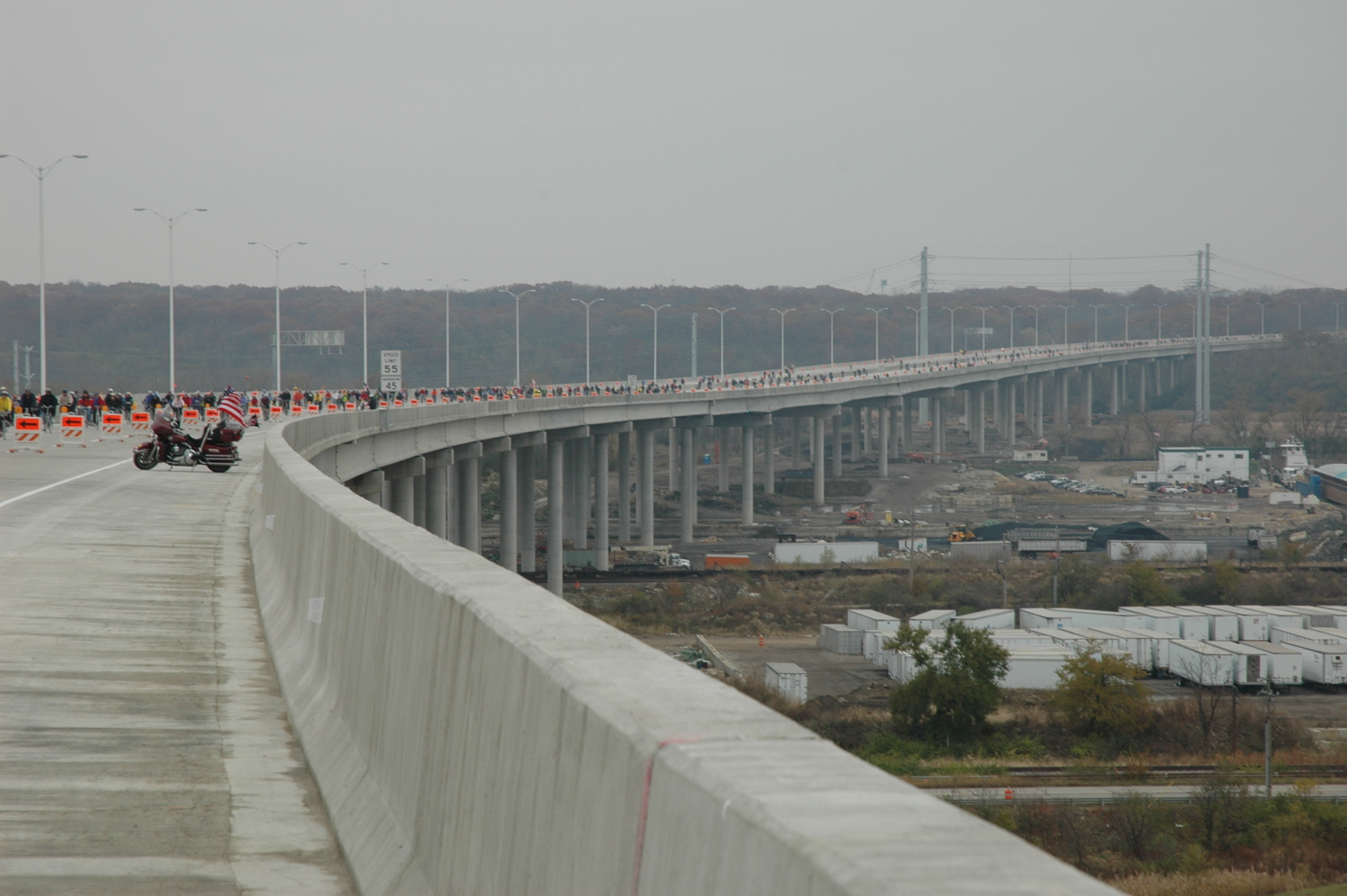
Des Plaines River Valley Bridge during Roll the Tollway opening ceremonies on November 11, 2007

In addition to the original alignment of I-355, the Transportation Plan of April 1962 included the concept of a route that ran from Bolingbrook south to Joliet. After the northern portion of I-355 opened in 1989, the Illinois General Assembly authorized the tollway authority to begin studying the southern extension of I-355.

The discovery of the Hine's Emerald Dragonfly, an endangered species, and related concerns for the environmental health of the Des Plaines River wetlands in 1995, ignited a series of legal challenges that delayed construction of the I-355 extension for several years. The Sierra Club filed a lawsuit in 1996 to block planning of the southern extension. In January 1997, a federal judge sided with the Sierra Club, halting construction of the southern extension while the state appealed. In 1999, the state dropped its appeal and amended the environmental impact study (EIS) to meet the Sierra Club's concerns. The state released the supplemental EIS in 2000, and in 2002 the FHWA issued a Record of Decision, allowing construction of the tollway to proceed after six years of delays. Land acquisition and utility relocation took place in 2004. Governor Rod Blagojevich's $5.6 billion Congestion-Relief Program for the Illinois Tollway passed the General Assembly in September 2004, with $729.3 million being set aside for the extension (equivalent to $8.89 billion and $1.16 billion in 2024, respectively). Bidding on an excavation contract passed on November 18, 2004 with construction beginning several days later.

To document and reduce the impact of construction on the dragonfly's habitat, construction crews agreed to keep carcasses of any dragonfly kills. In addition, the tollway authority funded the construction of separate habitats for the dragonfly near the Waterfall Glen Forest Preserve in Lemont and in two other preserves in Cook and Will counties. In late 2005, construction began on the roadway of the 12.5-mile-long (20.1 km) southern extension of I-355 from I-55 in Bolingbrook to I-80 in New Lenox.

Another controversy erupted in February 2006, when the tollway authority threatened to build the tollway with no interchanges unless the suburbs through which the new extension ran contributed $20 million (equivalent to $29.9 million in 2024) for construction of the interchanges. This marked the first time that the tollway authority had required local municipalities to contribute funds for interchange construction. The towns of Homer Glen, Lemont, New Lenox, Lockport and Will County agreed in a June 2006 intergovernmental agreement to provide $20 million in both cash and in-kind contributions for the interchanges.

The southern extension is expected to become an economic catalyst for municipalities located along the tollway. The Village of New Lenox estimates that it will receive an additional $12 million in sales taxes after its two malls are built out. In Lockport, officials have announced that new Home Depot and SuperTarget stores are planned for the areas near 159th Street and I-355. Commercial developers are also building large warehouse facilities in areas near the Lockport interchanges.

One of "the most impressive engineering feats on the state's 274 miles [441 km] of toll roads" is the Des Plaines River Valley Bridge, a bridge over the Des Plaines River, the Chicago Sanitary and Ship Canal, the Illinois and Michigan Canal, Bluff Road, New Avenue, numerous railroads, and a major Commonwealth Edison utility corridor. The bridge is 1.3 miles (2.1 km) long, and constituted $125 million of the cost of the extension. Work on the bridge included the construction of 34 piers and elevation of existing high-voltage electricity lines to accommodate the highway. To limit the number of piers in the valley, the tollway authority built the bridge with both 170-foot (52 m) pre-stressed bulb tee girders and 270-foot (82 m) post-tensioned segmental concrete girders. This was $12 million (equivalent to $17.4 million in 2024) cheaper than the concrete box girder design option, and $50 million (equivalent to $72.7 million in 2024) less than the steel plate girder design option. A design-build clause in the original contract for the bridge, in addition to success in the design-build contracts on the 2004–07 Tri-State Tollway widening and reconstruction, allowed project managers to redesign and build the new bridge.

The tollway authority held a ribbon cutting and dedication ceremony on Veterans Day (November 11), 2007, officially renaming the entire length of I-355 the Veterans Memorial Tollway. Ceremonies were held on the tollway near the 127th Street interchange in Lemont, at 147th Street in Homer Glen, and at US 6 in New Lenox. In addition to the dedication, the tollway authority sponsored a Charity Walk/Run/Roll and "Roll the Tollway", a charity pre-opening bicycle ride on the highway's south extension. After noting the success of the festival, a tollway spokesman announced plans to repeat the event annually, including the closure of the entire southern extension. He later clarified the tollway's position, indicating that while the extension would probably not be closed in its entirety in the future, a possible five-mile (8.0 km) ride across the Des Plaines River Valley Bridge may be held. At around 10:00 p.m. on November 11, a group of Illinois State Police vehicles and tollway maintenance vehicles escorted the first motorists southbound along the I-355 extension, stopping at each interchange to remove barricades. By the time the maintenance crews began to remove barricades along the northbound lanes of the extension, a group of 50 to 60 vehicles had gathered behind the crews.

=== Veterans Memorial Trail ===
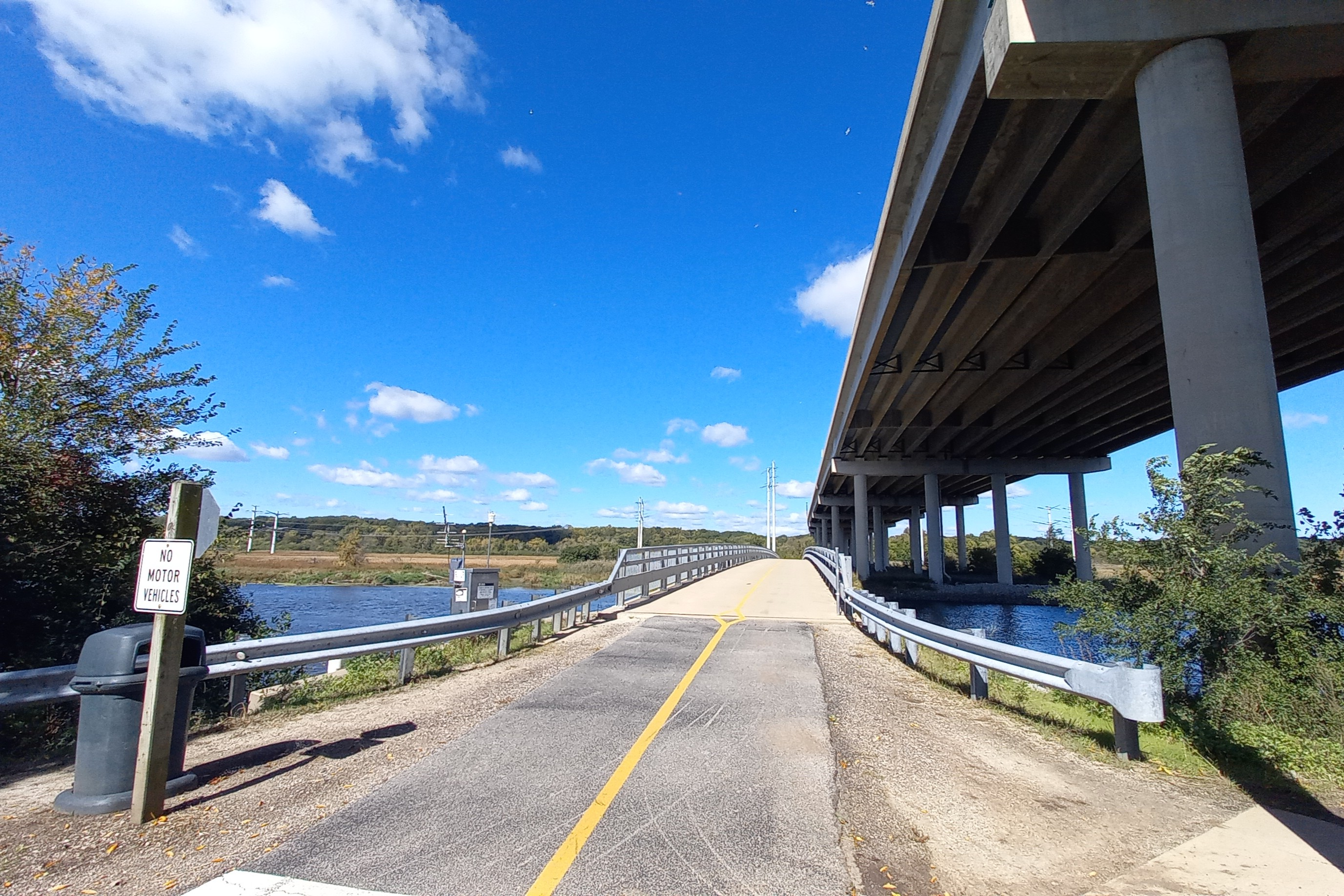
Veterans Memorial Trail next to the Des Plaines River Valley Bridge

As part of constructing the southern extension, the tollway authority donated a 15-to-20-foot-wide (5–6 m) corridor to local municipalities for the construction of a multi-use trail, named the Veterans Memorial Trail, that will run along most of the length of the tollway from I-80 to I-55. Completion of the trail is expected to cost $10 million, with funding to be provided by local communities along the path. A new construction fund for the trail was created from registration fees collected for "Roll the Tollway". The Active Transportation Alliance announced on January 29, 2008 that about $108,000 (equivalent to $154,000 in 2024) was raised through "Roll the Tollway". Of this amount, $70,000 (equivalent to $100,000 in 2024) was set aside for preliminary engineering studies on the 10.5-mile (16.9 km) bicycle trail. The remaining amount was directed towards advocacy efforts for the Chicago Bicycle Federation and other local bicycle clubs.

The initial engineering phase of the bike trail has been completed in the form of the I-355 Area Trails Master Plan, a framework created by Housel Lavigne Associates designed to distribute the work of creating and funding the trail among local communities. The Forest Preserve District of Will County has begun work on the Veterans Memorial Trail from International Parkway, Woodridge, to 135th Street, Romeoville, and will then extend the trail to US 6 in the Village of New Lenox. This addition will link the trail to a number of businesses in New Lenox, including a shopping mall currently being constructed, Silver Cross Hospital, and medical offices. The Omnibus Appropriations Act included $470,000 (equivalent to $658,000 in 2024) in federal funding for construction of the first phase of the trail.

== Route description ==
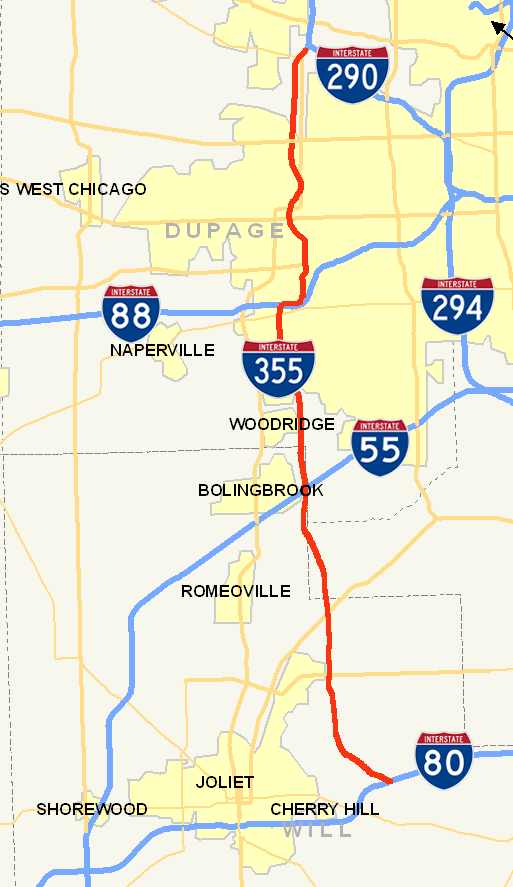
Detailed map of I-355

The southern terminus of I-355 is northeast of New Lenox, where the highway intersects I-80. I-355 is routed north and slightly west through rural, hilly portions of Will County. Just after the US 6 interchange (mile 1.0), tollway drivers pay a toll at Spring Creek Toll Plaza, the only toll plaza on the southern extension of I-355. It continues north through the rural sections of Will County, having exits that serve the towns of Homer Glen and Lockport. At 135th Street (approximately mile 8.0) in Lemont, I-355 briefly enters Cook County. After an interchange at 127th Street (mile 9.0), I-355 crosses over the Des Plaines River on the Des Plaines River Valley Bridge before returning to Will County. Shortly north of the bridge, I-355 intersects I-55 at Bolingbrook (mile 12.5). Multiple flyover ramps connect all directions of both highways.

North of I-55, I-355 continues to run almost due north through the established western suburbs of Chicago in DuPage County. Travelers pay another toll just north of Boughton Road, at the Boughton Road Toll Plaza (mile 13.5). Continuing north, I-355 has another multiple flyover interchange with I-88 (miles 19.5 and 23.0), officially designated the Ronald Reagan Memorial Tollway. On the southern end of the interchange, northbound I-355 has exits to both directions of I-88. I-355 then swings below I-88 and runs side-by-side with the other tollway for one mile (1.6 km). Southbound exits to both directions of I-88 are at the northern end of the interchange. At the Army Trail Road Toll Plaza (mile 29.0), through traffic pays the last toll of the tollway. I-355 has no tolls north of the Army Trail Road exit (mile 30) in Addison. There is one untolled exit (mile 31.5) at US 20 (Lake Street) north of the tollway. I-355 terminates at the I-290 interchange near the border of the villages of Itasca and Addison.

As a result of a toll rate increase effective January 1, 2012, the northernmost two toll plazas (Boughton Road and Army Trail Road) charge $1.90 cash and $0.95 for cars with I-Pass and E-ZPass. The Spring Creek Toll Plaza charges $3.80 for travelers paying with cash and $1.90 for I-Pass and E-ZPass. All three toll plazas force traffic paying with cash to exit right into an area separate from the dedicated I-Pass lanes. Drivers paying with cash then pay their tolls at staffed plaza tollbooths. I-Pass and E-ZPass equipped cars and trucks are permitted to stay on the mainline and pay tolls at highway speeds in the tollway's ORT lanes.

On I-355, the only control cities that are actual cities are Joliet, St. Louis, Missouri, and from I-80, Rockford. Other control cities on I-355 are limited to general areas of suburban Chicago. For example, control cities for I-355 while on I-55 are "West Suburbs" and "Southwest Suburbs". The control city for areas north of I-88 are "Northwest Suburbs".

Because of increasing congestion, the Veterans Memorial Tollway has been widened to eight lanes between 75th Street and US 34. The tollway authority added the four-mile (6.4 km), $60.4-million project (equivalent to $87.8 million in 2024) to its Congestion Relief Plan in mid-2007, and the new lanes opened on October 24, 2009.

== Exit list ==
County	Location	mi	km	Old exit	New exit	Destinations	Notes
Will	New Lenox	0.0	0.0		0	I-80 – Iowa, Indiana	Southern terminus; southern end of Veterans Memorial Tollway; signed as exits 0A (east) and 0B (west); I-80 exit 140
Will	New Lenox	1.0	1.6		1	US 6 (Southwest Highway)	Toll (northbound exit and southbound entrance)
Will	Lockport–Homer Glen line	3.5	5.6	Spring Creek Toll Plaza 99			
Will	Lockport–Homer Glen line	5.0	8.0		4	IL 7 (159th Street)	Toll (southbound exit and northbound entrance)
Will	Lockport–Homer Glen line	7.5	12.1		7	IL 171 (Archer Avenue) / 143rd Street	Toll (southbound exit and northbound entrance)
Cook	Lemont	9.0	14.5		8	127th Street	Toll (southbound exit and northbound entrance)
Des Plaines River		12.0	19.3	Des Plaines River Valley Bridge			
Will	Bolingbrook	12.5	20.1	0	12	I-55 – Chicago, St. Louis; Historic US 66 (Joliet Road)	Signed as exits 12A (north) and 12B (south); I-55 exit 269; exit 12A provides an exit ramp to Joliet road west; former southern terminus
Will	Bolingbrook	13.5	21.7	1	13	Boughton Road	Toll (northbound exit and southbound entrance); to 87th Street
DuPage	Bolingbrook	14.5	23.3	Boughton Road Toll Plaza 89			
DuPage	Woodridge	15.5	24.9	3	15	CR 33 (75th Street)	Toll (southbound exit and northbound entrance)
DuPage	Woodridge	17.0	27.4	5	17	CR 38 east (63rd Street) / CR 2 west (Hobson Road)	Toll (southbound exit and northbound entrance)
DuPage	Lisle–Downers Grove village line	18.5	29.8	6	18	CR 17 (Maple Avenue)	Toll (southbound exit and northbound entrance)
DuPage	Lisle–Downers Grove village line	19.5	31.4	7; 8B	19; 20B	US 34 (Ogden Avenue)	Signed as exits 19 southbound and 20B northbound; southbound exit ramp merges with I-88 eastbound exit ramp to US 34
DuPage	Downers Grove	19.5– 22.5	31.4– 36.2	8	20	I-88 Toll / IL 110 (CKC) (Ronald Reagan Memorial Tollway) – Aurora, Chicago	Signed as exit 20A northbound; I-88 west exit 131, east exits 131–132; I-88 and I-355 run side-by-side for over two miles (3.2 km) at this point
DuPage	Downers Grove	22.5	36.2	10	22	IL 56 (Butterfield Road)	Toll (northbound exit and southbound entrance)
DuPage	Glen Ellyn–Lombard village line	24.5	39.4	12	24	IL 38 (Roosevelt Road)	Toll (northbound exit and southbound entrance)
DuPage	Glendale Heights–Lombard village line	28.0	45.1	15	27	IL 64 (North Avenue)	Toll (northbound exit and southbound entrance)
DuPage	Glendale Heights–Lombard village line	29.0	46.7	Army Trail Road Toll Plaza 73			
DuPage	Addison	30.0	48.3	17	29	CR 11 (Army Trail Road)	Northern end of Veterans Memorial Tollway
DuPage	Addison	31.5	50.7	19	31	US 20 (Lake Street)	
DuPage	Addison–Itasca village line	32.5	52.3	20	32	I-290 to IL 53 north / I-90 Toll – Rockford, Chicago	Northern terminus; I-290 exit 7
1.000 mi = 1.609 km; 1.000 km = 0.621 mi: Electronic toll collection; Route transition
