= Des Plaines River Valley Bridge =

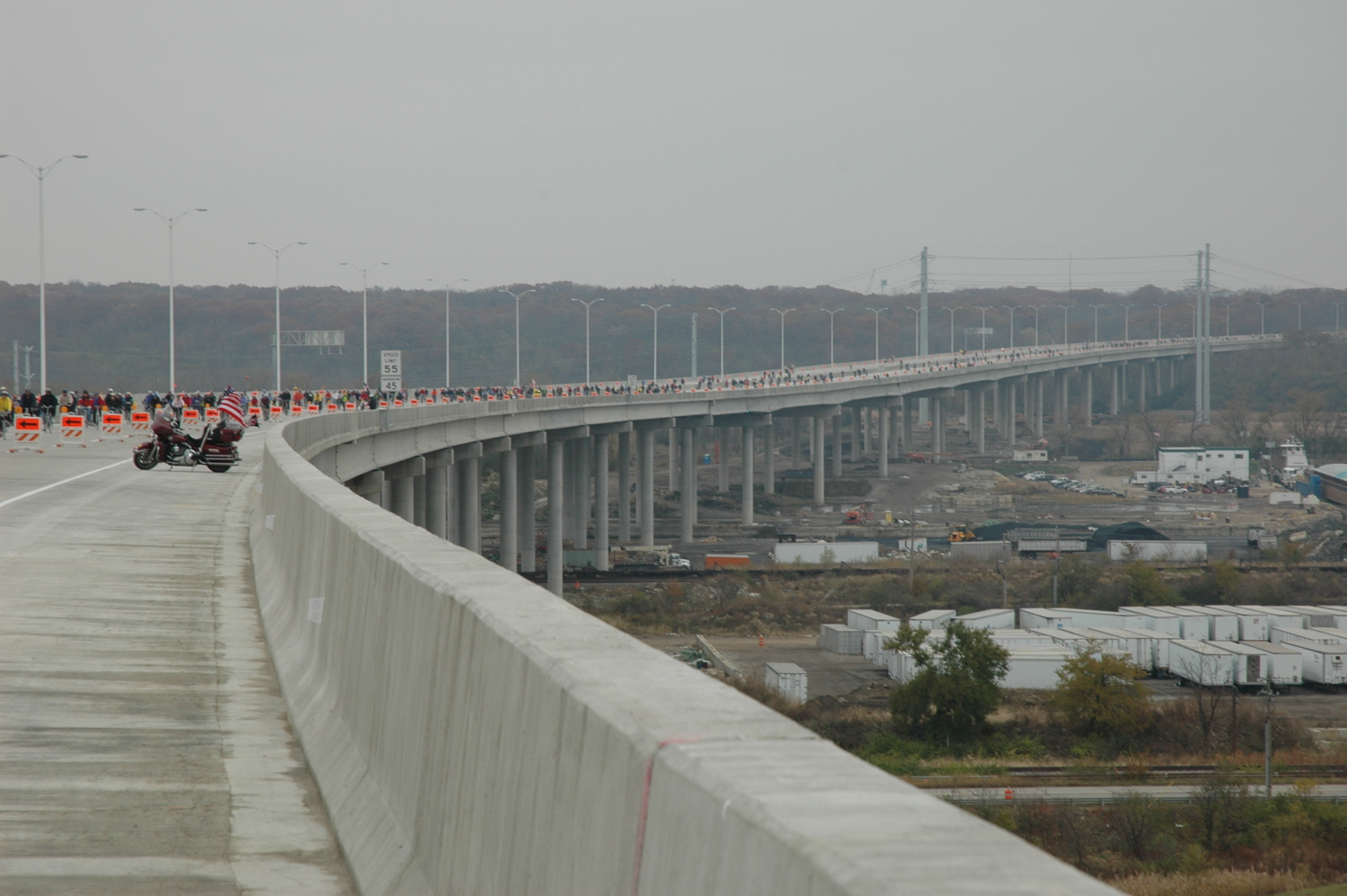
- Des Plaines River Valley Bridge during Roll the Tollway ceremonies on November 11, 2007.
- Coordinates: 41.6728°N 88.0293°W
- Carries: 6 lanes of I-355 Toll
- Crosses: Des Plaines River, Illinois and Michigan Canal, Sanitary and Ship Canal, several railroad lines, Bluff Road, New Avenue, and a forest preserve
- Locale: Lemont, IL
- Maintained by: ISTHA

Characteristics
- Design: Post-tensioned concrete girder
- Total length: 1.3 miles (2.1 km)

History
- Opened: November 12, 2007

The Des Plaines River Valley Bridge is a post-tensioned concrete girder toll bridge in the northeastern portion of the U.S. state of Illinois. It carries Interstate 355 (I-355) over the Des Plaines River, the Chicago Sanitary and Ship Canal, the Illinois and Michigan Canal, several railroad lines, Bluff Road, New Avenue and a forest preserve. It is officially named the Veterans Memorial Bridge. There are title plaques on the square pillars at the north and south entrances to the bridge. The bridge is 1.3 miles (2.1 km) long.

The bridge consists of 34 piers from 10 to 75 feet (3 to 23 m) in height. A lower level bridge was also built for maintenance purposes, and to carry a bicycle trail that will connect other bicycle trails in the area. The total height of the bridge ranges from 80 to 100 feet (24 to 30 m). The height of the bridge allows the endangered Hine's Emerald Dragonfly to fly safely beneath the bridge, away from the flow of traffic.
