= Emma Stirling =

British social activist (1839 - 1907)

Emma Maitland Stirling
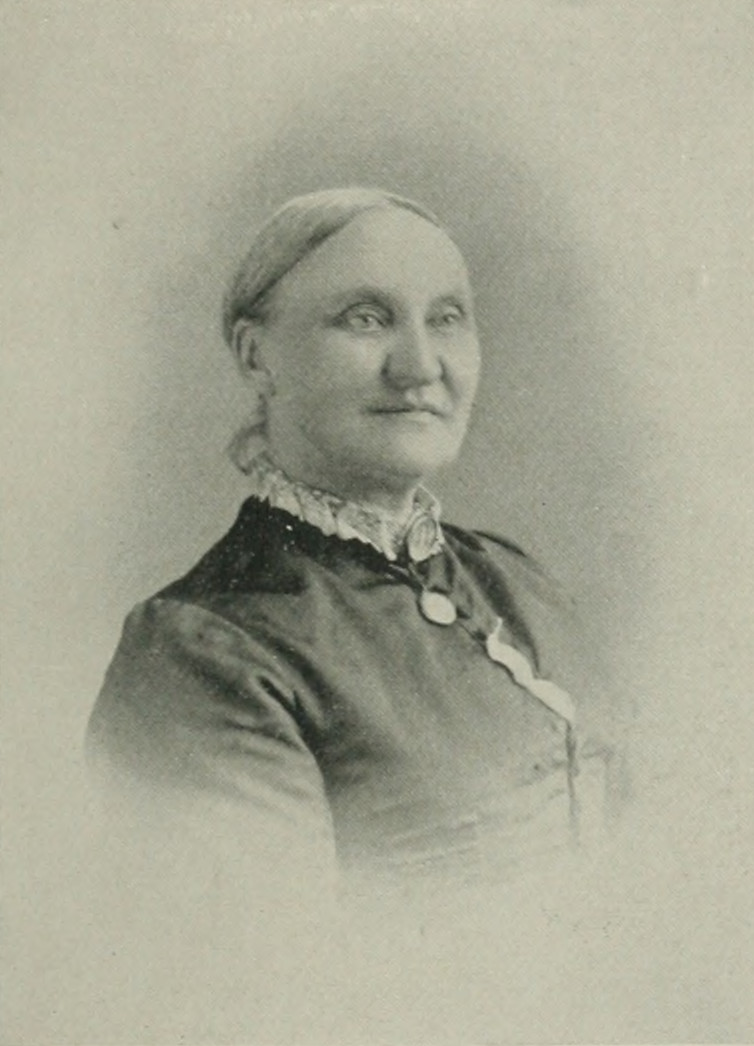
- Born: 15 December 1839; Edinburgh
- Died: 2 September 1907; Coatesville, Pennsylvania
- Known for: caring for abused children

Emma Maitland Stirling (1839 - 1907) was a British activist in child welfare and in arranging their emigration to Canada. She created the organisation that became the Scottish Society for the Prevention of Cruelty to Children (a.k.a. Children 1st), but her contribution was not acknowledged in their history.

== Life ==
Stirling was born in Edinburgh to a rich family and she was brought up in St Andrews. Her family had both Scottish and American roots and they would spend the winters in England. Stirling became involved in her teens with the local school where she progressed from helper to secretary.

In 1877, she moved to Edinburgh financed by a substantial inheritance. In Edinburgh she established and subsidised a nursery for working mothers. She took on a board of directors and the Stirling Homes became the Edinburgh and Leith Children's Aid and Refuge Society. Stirling also opened the first home for abused children in Edinburgh in 1884. Under the patronage of the John Hamilton-Gordon, 1st Marquess of Aberdeen and Temair her organisation grew to eight homes that housed 300 children. This organisation grew into the Scottish Society for the Prevention of Cruelty to Children, although Stirling resigned in 1877.

== Canada ==
In 1882, Stirling visited Canada and reported being disappointed at the lack of respect given to child emigrants from Britain. However she believed that child emigration could be beneficial and she established her own organisation at Aylesford, Nova Scotia. Stirling's work was confused by legal disputes concerning children who were sent to Canada and later their parents objected. In one case the child was returned but Stirling refused to let the child return to her alcoholic parents. Eventually the courts agreed and this has been seen as important case-law as the child's needs were placed above the parents requests. In another case there were long proceedings against Stirling for the return of a man's family. They had been placed into the care of the Edinburgh and Leith Children's Aid and Refuge Society and Stirling had later arranged their emigration. Stirling at first claimed that they had been placed with good families, but it later became obvious that she did not know where they were. Stirling agreed to pay the legal costs on the condition that her name appeared on the title page of the Scottish society.

== Abortion, arson and USA ==
Stirling moved to the USA after her farm was burnt to the ground in 1895. She and local newspapers believed this was arson. Stirling had caused controversy when she had a local man and doctor charged with performing an illegal abortion. The abortion was performed on Grace Fagan who was a former emigrant who had become pregnant by the man who had agreed to look after her. Stirling was annoyed at the lack of support and she decided to devote herself to animal rights and died in Coatesville in Pennsylvania in 1907. She left her wealth to charities and friends.
