= Elmvale Jungle Zoo =

Canadian zoo

- Interactive map of Elmvale Jungle Zoo
- 44.55035°N 79.83569°W
- Date opened: 1967
- Location: Springwater, Ontario, Canada
- Land area: 0.101 km^{2} (0.039 sq mi)
- No. of animals: 300
- Website: elmvalejunglezoo.com

The Elmvale Jungle Zoo is a zoo in Springwater, Ontario, Canada. It is a seasonal business open from Victoria Day weekend until Canadian Thanksgiving weekend. It was founded in 1967.

It is run by Sam Persi, whose family purchased the zoo in 1972. When established the zoo was only 2 acres large, and exhibited mainly reptiles and birds. It has grown to include over 300 animals from countries around the world such as South America, Australia, Africa, and Asia.

The zoo is located 20 minutes north of Barrie, near Elmvale, and covers 25 acres. It is a popular destination for school field trips, with the zoo seeing 150 trips during June alone.

== See also ==
- List of zoos in Canada
