= Devil's Goose Pasture =

Barren sand plain in Nova Scotia

Devil's Goose Pasture is a historic place name for a barren sand plain located near Aylesford in Kings County, Nova Scotia. The legend has it that the sand plain was once owned by the Lord, the King, and the Devil. The glebe lands to the first, the ungranted lands to the second, and the barren sand plain to the last, hence the name.

== See also ==
- Toponymy of Nova Scotia
