= Minesing Wetlands =

Wetland in Ontario, Canada

Coordinates: 44.3953°N 79.8605°W

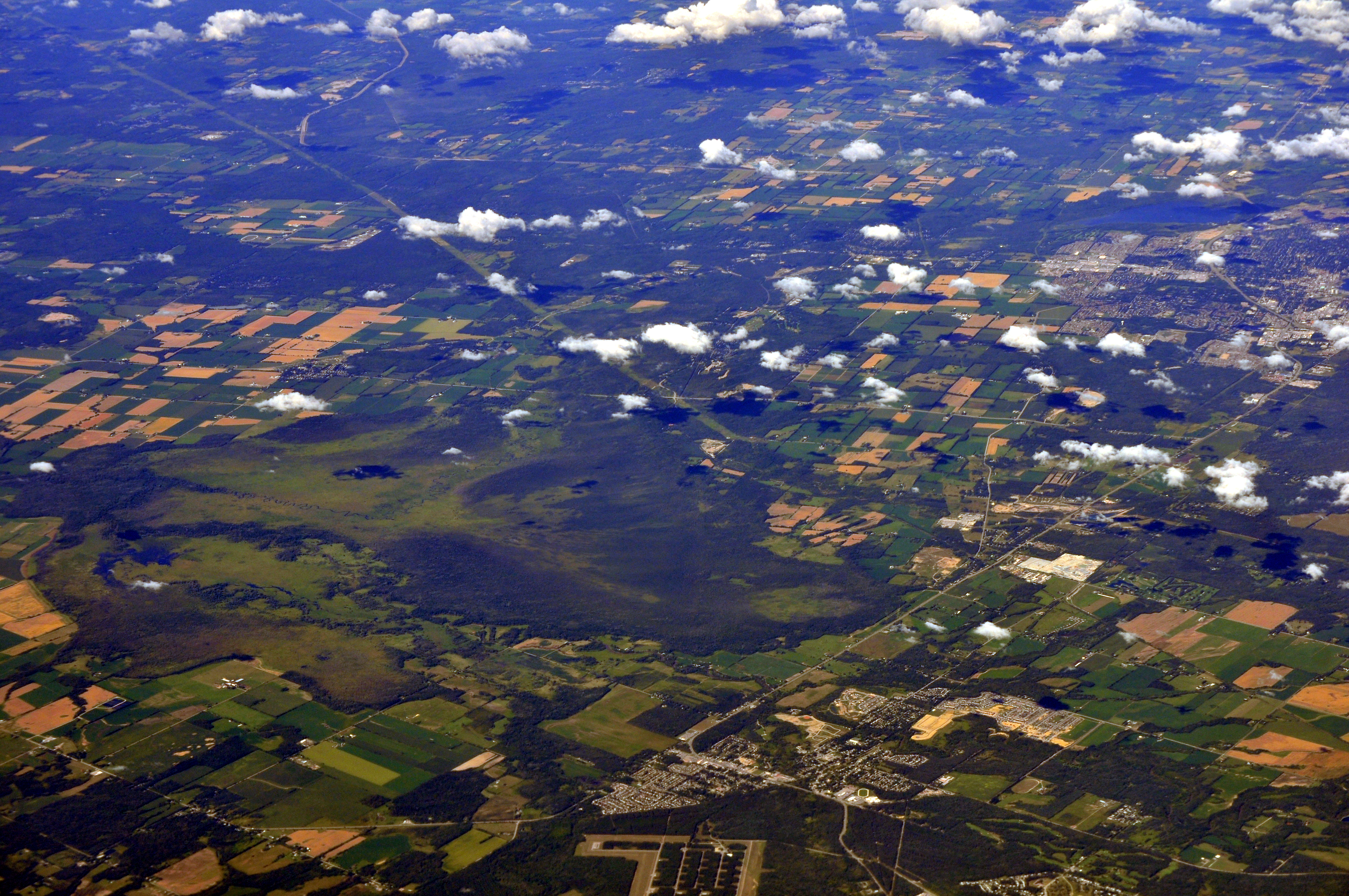
- Aerial view of Minesing Wetlands, August 2013; Angus, Ontario, at bottom center, Barrie at right
- Interactive map of Minesing Wetlands
- Nearest city: Barrie
- Area: 60 square kilometres (23 sq mi)

Ramsar Wetland
- Official name: Minesing Swamp
- Designated: 31 October 1996
- Reference no.: 865

Minesing Wetlands or Minesing Swamp is a Ramsar boreal wetland in central Ontario, Canada, stretching from the western periphery of Barrie to Georgian Bay. It was identified and classified through the International Biological Program. It is "the largest and best example of fen bog in southern Ontario", one of the "most diverse undisturbed wetland tracts in Canada" and is a provincially significant Area of Natural and Scientific Interest. The term minesing is of Ojibwe origin and means "island", referring to an island located within Lake Edenvale, which encompassed the present-day wetlands and surrounding areas.

The swamp's hydrology "provides for an interconnected network of swamps, fens, bogs and marshes". It acts as a reservoir that absorbs floodwater during spring thaw, from which a slow and steady flow is released throughout the summer into the Nottawasaga River system. This also prevents spring flooding of Wasaga Beach.

Approximately 39 square kilometres (15 sq mi) of the 60 square kilometres (23 sq mi) is owned or managed by the Nottawasaga Valley Conservation Authority. The remainder is owned by the Ministry of Natural Resources, the Simcoe County, and private landowners. It straddles the three townships of Clearview, Essa and Springwater.

It provides habitat to over 400 plant species, of which 11 are provincially rare. Minesing Wetlands is an important staging area for thousands of migratory waterfowl, and is the largest wintering ground for white-tailed deer. It supports numerous plant species which are at the extremities of their natural range, including those indigenous to the arctic tundra in the north and the Carolinian forests to the south, and is home to the "largest pure stand of silver maple in the province". Provincially rare birds indigenous to the swamp include the blue-winged warbler, prothonotary warbler, cerulean warbler, golden-winged warbler and the blue-grey gnatcatcher. It is the only location in Canada where the Hine's Emerald dragonfly can be found.

Minesing Wetlands is a popular recreation area which draws many tourists. Canoeing is a common activity in the area, though inexperienced canoeists should be wary of spring flooding.

== Research ==
A number of research projects are conducted throughout Minesing Wetlands. An analysis of the hydrology of wetland systems in the swamp began in the mid-1990s, with primary goals to "characterize the water balance of a selected plot within the fen" and to examine "the correlations between vegetation and hydrology".
