= Indian River Reptile and Dinosaur Park =

Canada's Dinosaur Park
- Interactive map of Canada's Dinosaur Park
- Location: Indian River, Ontario
- No. of species: 200
- Owner: Bry Loyst

Canada's Dinosaur Park is a small reptile zoo located in Indian River, Ontario, approximately 15 kilometres east of Peterborough, Ontario. It has been a registered non-profit organization since 1999. In 2021 the park re-branded, changing their name from Indian River Reptile and Dinosaur Park to Canada's Dinosaur Park.

== Attractions ==
Canada's Dinosaur Park features more than 100 life size dinosaurs and other prehistoric creatures, most of which are animatronic. In 2020 the park added a drive-thru section to go along with the walking area. They have also added a miniature golf course that is based on Stonehenge.

As the largest reptile not-for-profit in Canada, the park is also home to more than 200 reptiles of both native and exotic species.

An outdoor Croc-Walk features dozens of live crocodilians. Species of alligator, crocodile, and caiman are spread out over six ponds and inside their designated building.

The park rents out their animatronic dinosaurs for birthdays and events.

== Conservation ==
Although the zoo offers visitors the opportunity to see a wide range of reptiles, much of its focus is also on the preservation and conservation of all reptile species. This effort includes staffing of highly trained and passionate zoo keepers who help educate the public and spread awareness, as well as various ongoing conservation programs.

== See also ==
- List of zoos in Canada
