= List of aquaria in Canada =

This is a list of public aquariums in Canada. For zoos in Canada, see List of zoos in Canada.

Aquariums are facilities where animals are confined within tanks and displayed to the public, and in which they may also be bred. Such facilities include public aquariums, oceanariums, marine mammal parks, and dolphinariums.

== Alberta ==
- West Edmonton Mall: Major Attractions, Sea Life Caverns - Edmonton

== British Columbia ==
- Pacific Undersea Gardens (operated from 1964 to 2013) - Victoria
- Sealand of the Pacific (operated from 1969 to 1992) - Victoria
- Ucluelet Aquarium - Ucluelet
- Vancouver Aquarium - Vancouver
- Shaw Centre for the Salish Sea - Sidney
- Discovery Passage Aquarium - Campbell River
- Alberni Aquarium and Stewardship Centre - Port Alberni
- Nicholas Sonntag Marine Education Centre - Gibsons, British Columbia

== New Brunswick ==
- Huntsman Marine Science Centre Aquarium/Sealab - St. Andrews

== Nova Scotia ==
- Beaty Centre for Marine Biodiversity - Halifax, Nova Scotia

== Ontario ==
- Aquatarium - Brockville
- Marineland of Canada - Niagara Falls (operated from 1961 to 2024)
- Ripley's Aquarium of Canada - Toronto

== Quebec ==
- Aquarium du Québec - Sainte-Foy, Quebec
- Montreal Aquarium (operated from 1966 to 1991)
- Montreal Biodome - Montreal

== See also ==
- List of aquaria
