= Springwater, Ontario =

Springwater
- Township (lower-tier)
- Township of Springwater
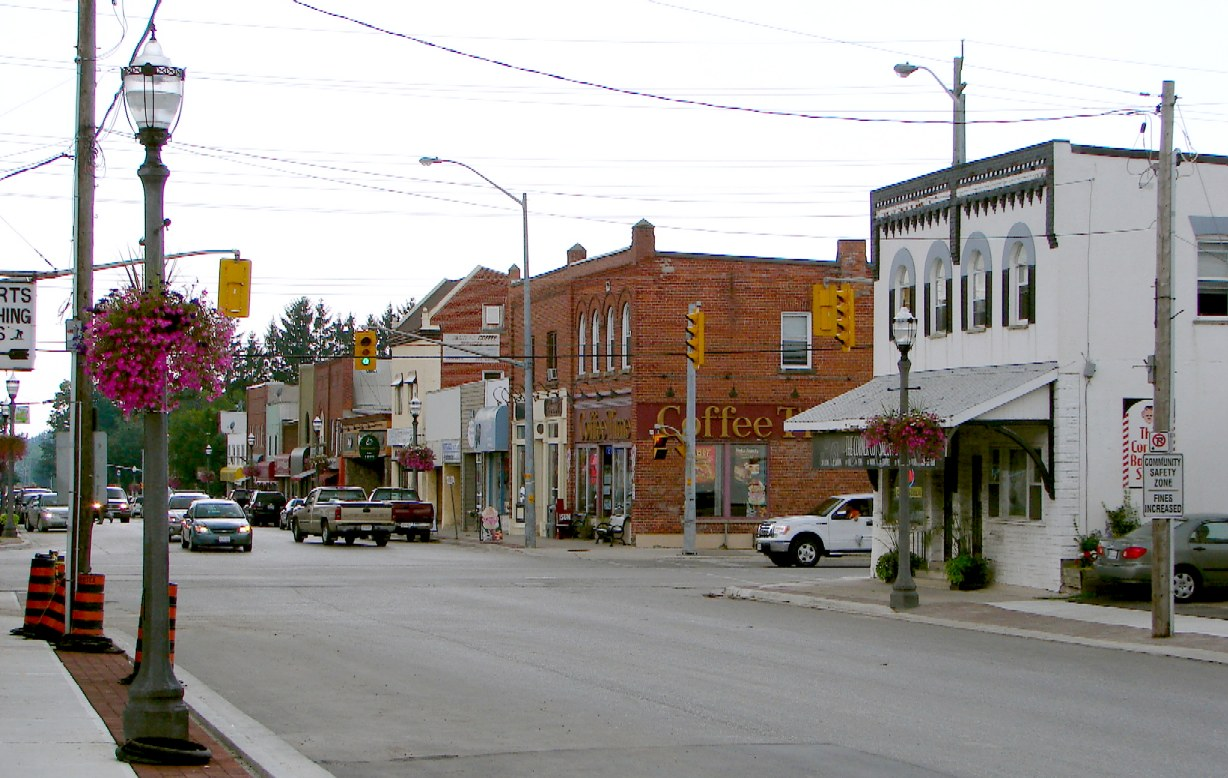
- Elmvale

- Location within Simcoe County Location within Southern Ontario
- Coordinates: 44°26′N 79°44′W
- Country: Canada
- Province: Ontario
- County: Simcoe
- Formed: 1994

Government
  - Mayor: Jennifer Coughlin
  - MPs: Doug Shipley
  - MPPs: Doug Downey

Area
  - Land: 535.85 km^{2} (206.89 sq mi)

Population (2021)
  - Total: 21,701
  - Density: 40.5/km^{2} (105/sq mi)
- Time zone: UTC−5 (Eastern (EST))
  - Summer (DST): UTC−4 (EDT)
- Postal code FSA: L0L & L9X
- Area codes: 705, 249
- Website: www.springwater.ca

Springwater is a township in central Ontario, Canada, in Simcoe County, near Barrie. It is the county seat of Simcoe County.

== History ==
Prior to European settlement, Ossossane, the largest Wendat settlement and capital of the confederacy was located near modern-day Elmvale.

Springwater was formed on January 1, 1994, through the amalgamation of Flos and Vespra Townships, together with the Villages of Elmvale and Hillsdale, as well as a portion of the former Medonte Township.

In 2026, two portions the township were annexed by the City of Barrie, with Barrie absorbing the community of Crown Hill. As part of the agreement, the City of Barrie will service the area between the annexed portions (centred on Highway 26) with its municipal water and sewer systems.

== Communities ==
Anten Mills is centred on the intersection of Horseshoe Valley Road West (formally County Road 22) and Wilson Drive (formally the 7th Concession of Vespra), 15 kilometres (9.3 mi) northwest of Barrie. The community derived its name from a well-known mill operating in the area in the late 1800s. The first syllables of this firm's name, after its owners Charles Anderson and a Mr. Tennant, were merged to create the word Anten. Country music star Jason McCoy grew up in Anten Mills.

Most of the workforce living in Anten Mills are employed in nearby Barrie. The area surrounding Anten Mills is predominantly either farm or crown land; however, golf courses, ski resorts and hiking trails also dot the landscape.

Some 25 kilometres (16 mi) northwest of Anten Mills is Wasaga Beach, a popular summer tourist attraction.

Elmvale is located at the intersection of County Road 27 (formerly Highway 27) and County Road 92 (Queen Street). The Elmvale Maple Syrup Festival, established in 1966, draws thousands of visitors each year. Elmvale was home to 2,369 people in 2011. It is the site of the Elmvale Jungle Zoo.

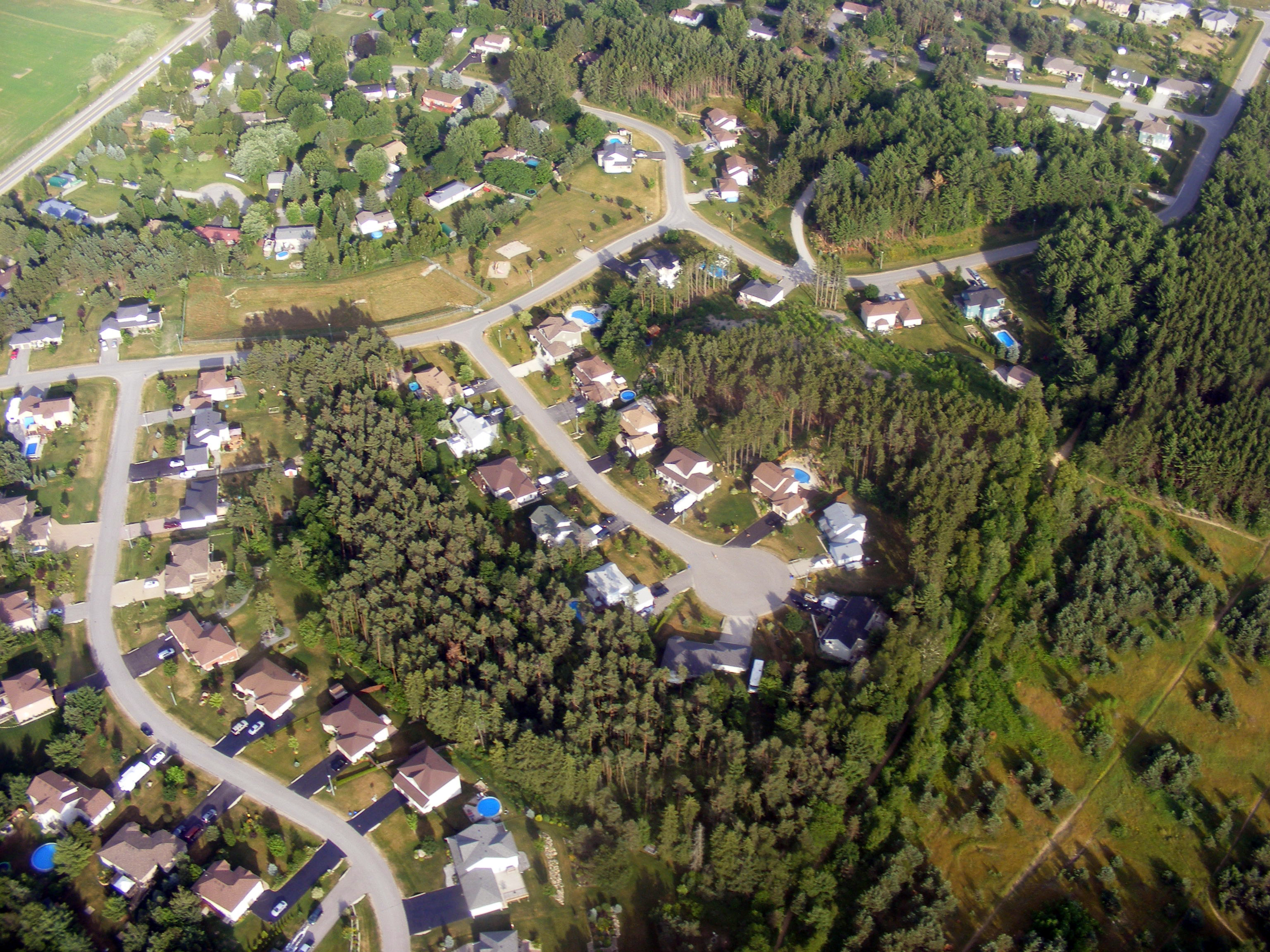
Aerial photo of a portion of Hillsdale

Hillsdale is located on Highway 93 a short distance north of Highway 400. It was founded as the half-way point between Lake Simcoe and Georgian Bay. It was the site of the Simcoe House Hotel (now abandoned). Hillsdale is home to approximately 1,000 people.

Midhurst is the largest population centre in the township. It is home to the Barrie Baycats of the Intercounty Baseball League. A tree nursery operated here that supplied trees for the province.

Minesing is a community near the Nottawasaga River on Highway 26, northwest of Barrie. The community holds two major events every year, one in the late winter called Mini-fest, and a slow-pitch tournament that falls on Labour Day weekend. The community is the birthplace of Frank Foyston and is home to musician Jason McCoy. It has a small school known as Minesing Central Public School. The nearby Minesing Wetlands is an internationally recognized wetland of significant biological importance. Simcoe County Museum is located here.

Along with the main centres of Anten Hills, Crown Hill, Elmvale, Hillsdale, Midhurst and Minesing, the township contains the communities of Allenwood, Apto, Craighurst, Crossland, Dalston, Edenvale, Fergusonvale, Grenfel, Hendrie, Langman, New Flos, Orr Lake, Phelpston, Sandy Beach, Saurin, Snow Valley, Vespra Village, Strongville and Vigo. Two former ghost communities, called Josephine and McKinnon, existed in the Minesing Swamp within the township's borders.

== Demographics ==
In the 2021 Census of Population conducted by Statistics Canada, Springwater had a population of 21,701 living in 7,516 of its 7,845 total private dwellings, a change of 13.9% from its 2016 population of 19,059. With a land area of 535.85 km^{2} (206.89 sq mi), it had a population density of 40.5/km^{2} (104.9/sq mi) in 2021.

Canada census – Springwater, Ontario community profile

	2021	2016	2011
Population	21,701 (+13.9% from 2016)	19,059 (+4.6% from 2011)	18,223 (+4.4% from 2006)
Land area	535.85 km^{2} (206.89 sq mi)	536.28 km^{2} (207.06 sq mi)	536.23 km^{2} (207.04 sq mi)
Population density	40.5/km^{2} (105/sq mi)	35.5/km^{2} (92/sq mi)	34.0/km^{2} (88/sq mi)
Median age	43.2 (M: 42.8, F: 43.2)	43.4 (M: 43.0, F: 43.7)
Private dwellings	7,845 (total) 7,516 (occupied)	7,234 (total)	6,691 (total)
Median household income	$122,000	$99,553

References: 2021 2016 2011

Historical census populations – Springwater, Ontario
Year	Pop.	±%
1996	14,793	—
2001	16,104	+8.9%
2006	17,456	+8.4%
2011	18,223	+4.4%
2016	19,059	+4.6%
2021	21,701	+13.9%
Source: Statistics Canada

== Government ==
Springwater is governed by a seven-person elected Council; a Mayor, Deputy Mayor, and five Ward Councillors. The council is currently comprised by:

- Mayor: Jennifer Coughlin
- Deputy Mayor: George Cabral
- Ward 1 Councillor: Matt Garwood
- Ward 2 Councillor: Danielle Alexander
- Ward 3 Councillor: Brad Thompson
- Ward 4 Councillor: Anita Moore
- Ward 5 Councillor: Phil Fisher

=== Committees ===
Springwater also has a number of committees that advise Council on more specific issues.

The Springwater Public Library Board consists of Jane Cocking, Jennifer St-Onge, Evan Chen Adrian Graham, Robert Sturgess, and Stephen Ouderkirk.

The Committee of Adjustment consists of Henry Vander Wielen, Brad Sokach, Michael Douglas, Wanda Maw-Chapman (chair) and Steven Farquharson (Vice Chair).

The Agricultural Advisory Committee consists of James Drury, Mark Priest (chair), Matt Ververs, and Wanda Maw-Chapman.

The Cultural and Heritage Advisory Committee consists of Hale Mahon (chair), Donna Kenwell, Greg Barker, Catherine Czajkowski, Joan Gannon, and James Crawford.

The member representing Springwater on the Joint Accessibility Advisory Committee is Caleb Brohm.

== See also ==
- List of townships in Ontario
