= Gardner Swamp Wildlife Area =

State Wildlife Area in Door County, Wisconsin

- Gardner Swamp State Wildlife Area
- IUCN category V (protected landscape/seascape)
- Location within Wisconsin Location within the United States
- Location: Door County, Wisconsin
- Nearest city: Sturgeon Bay, WI
- Coordinates: 44°47′37″N 87°35′31″W
- Area: 1,180 acres (4.8 km^{2})
- Established: 1980
- Governing body: Wisconsin Department of Natural Resources

The Gardner Swamp Wildlife Area is a 1,180 acres (480 ha) tract of protected land located in Door County, Wisconsin, managed by the Wisconsin Department of Natural Resources. Land to be used for the Wildlife Area was first acquired in 1958, and the master plan for the Wildlife Area was completed in 1980.

== Gardner Swamp ==
The swamp for which the Wildlife Area is named after has several different types of land covering it. Land cover types include Upland Broad-leaved Deciduous Forest, Upland Grass, Open Wetland/Marsh, Shrub Wetland, and the most commonly found, Forested Wetland, which covers 442 acres (179 ha), or 38% of the entire Wildlife Area. When the Wisconsin Department of Natural Resources (DNR) began to consolidate parcels of the swamp, hunters and landowners in the area were supportive of the actions as the area would frequently flood due to beavers constructing dams along the Keyes Creek, a river that bisects the Wildlife Area.

== Flora and fauna ==
The above-mentioned river, Keyes Creek, in addition to bisecting the Wildlife Area, is also classified as a Class II Trout Stream, and is used as a spawning ground for northern pike and white sucker. In addition to varied species of fish that can be found in Keyes Creek, the Wildlife Area is home to various waterfowl, deer, beaver, woodcock, shorebirds, and the occasional bald eagle.

The Wildlife Area is also home to the critically endangered Hine's emerald dragonfly.

== See also ==
- Sturgeon Bay
