= Oaklawn Farm Zoo =

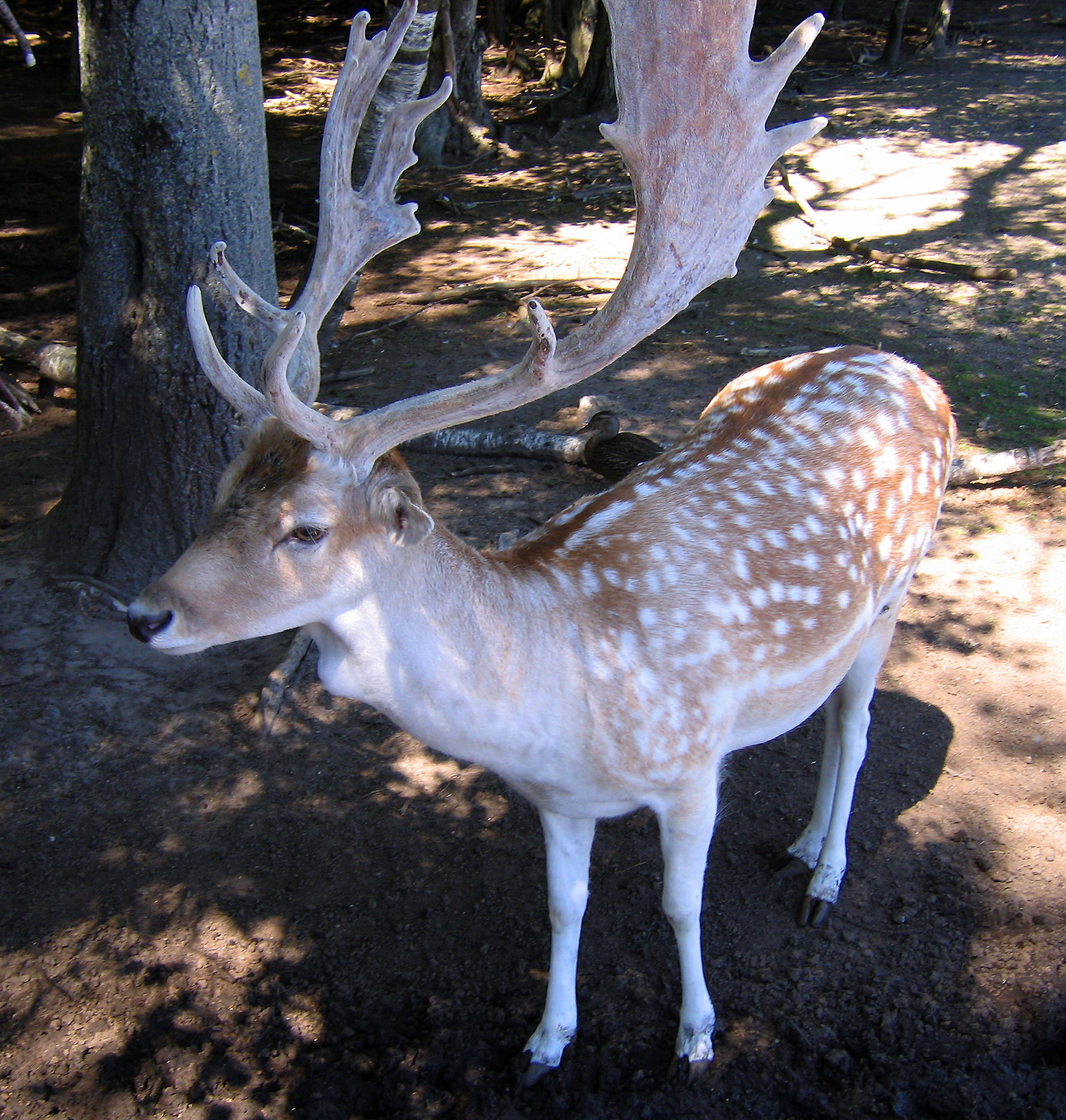
- Deer at Oaklawn Farm Zoo
- Interactive map of Oaklawn Farm Zoo
- 45.0044382°N 64.8445768°W
- Date opened: 1984
- Date closed: 2023
- Location: Aylesford, Nova Scotia, Canada
- Land area: 50 acres (20 ha)
- Major exhibits: lions, monkeys, Siberian tigers
- Website: oaklawnfarmzoo.ca

The Oaklawn Farm Zoo was a zoo located in Millville, Nova Scotia, Canada, just south of the village of Aylesford. Before closing, it was Nova Scotia's largest zoo. The zoo opened in 1984, and was family-owned and operated by Ron and Gail Rogerson. The zoo boasted the largest display of Big Cats and Primates in Eastern Canada. The 50-acre (20 ha) zoo was in a rural setting in Nova Scotia's Annapolis Valley.

The zoo included a large variety of mammals, birds and reptiles, encompassing endangered and threatened species of exotic and native species, as well as domestic breeds of animals. Children could feed corn to some of the hoofstock, and the feeding of the big cats and bears was a popular attraction. Owner Gail Rogerson would enter the cages of these animals and would hand feed them meat that was collected from local farms and surrounding areas.

The zoo had a restaurant and gift shop.

The zoo announced in December 2023 that it would not reopen in 2024, after 40 seasons.

== Origin ==
Ron and Gail Rogerson started a farm in the 1970s with conventional animals and some exotic animals. By 1975, schools would go on field trips to the farm to learn about the animals. A program known as “Learning to Live” started in 1980 which allowed children to get experience with how to take care of animals. In 1984, the farm decided to open as a zoo and incorporated many new animals into the facility.

== Animals ==
An African lion named Rutledge was born at the zoo in 1991 and hand raised. At 4 years, he set the world record for world's heaviest lion in captivity at 807 pounds (366 kg). He was euthanized in February 2009, just short of his 18th birthday, and buried at the zoo. Another male African lion, Obi, was diagnosed with kidney failure in October 2017 and was euthanized on 6 August 2019.

Animals included

- Capybara
- Patagonian Mara
- Pot-bellied pig
- North American porcupine
- Crested porcupine
- Brazilian agouti
- Dromedary camel
- Bactrian camel
- Meerkat
- South African cheetah (now at Toronto Zoo)
- Lion (now at Parc Safari)
- Siberian tiger
- Chilean rose tarantula
- Goliath birdeater
- Eastern painted turtle
- Red-footed tortoise
- Tokay gecko
- Squirrel monkey
- Green iguana
- Common marmoset
- Straw-coloured fruit bat
- Spider monkey
- Snowy owl
- Barred owl
- Great horned owl
- Common raven
- American black bear
- Masked lovebird
- Burmese python
- Japanese macaque
- Lion-tailed macaque
- Rhea
- Black swan
- Llama
- Indian peafowl
- Alpaca
- Guanaco
- Zonkey
- Cougar
- Plains zebra
- Ostrich
- Common snapping turtle
- Bald eagle
- Jaguar
- Serval
- Leopard cat
- Caracal
- Domestic cat
- Ferret
