= Children First =

Scottish children's charity

- Formation: 1889; 137 years ago
- Location: Edinburgh, Scotland
- Formerly called: Royal Scottish Society for Prevention of Cruelty to Children

Children First, previously known as the Royal Scottish Society for Prevention of Cruelty to Children, is a Scottish charity which aims to give every child in Scotland a safe and secure childhood. Children First supports families under stress, protects children from harm and neglect, promotes children's rights and helps children recover from abuse.

== History ==
The official history of the society ignores the role of Emma Stirling which the Oxford Dictionary of National Biography believes may be due to her gender or a legal dispute, but it was Stirling who created the first, and later eight homes for abused and neglected Scottish children in 1884. Another source agrees that Stirling's Edinburgh society was the precursor of the Scottish Society for the Prevention of Cruelty to Children.

The New York society believe that the Royal Scottish Society for Prevention of Cruelty to Children has its origins in the anti cruelty movement that grew in America in the 19th century. Following a landmark lawsuit, in which the American Society for the Prevention of Cruelty to Animals took a case under animal cruelty legislation against two New Yorkers for abusing an eight-year-old child, Societies for the Prevention of Cruelty to Children sprang up on both sides of the Atlantic.

In 1884, there was a home for abused children in Edinburgh. It was beginning to be understood that there was a considerable amount of abuse being perpetrated on children in the UK. In order to counter this, the first Society for the Prevention of Cruelty to Children was established in London. Following on from this creation in England branches began to be set up throughout Scotland and in 1889, the Glasgow and Edinburgh branches joined to form the Scottish National Society for Prevention of Cruelty to Children. Even in 1913, Dundee SPCC was considering whether it was appropriate for a 'lady representative' to sit on its board, and asked Mary H.J. Henderson to organise this.

In the same year, the first Act of Parliament for the Prevention of Cruelty to Children was passed.

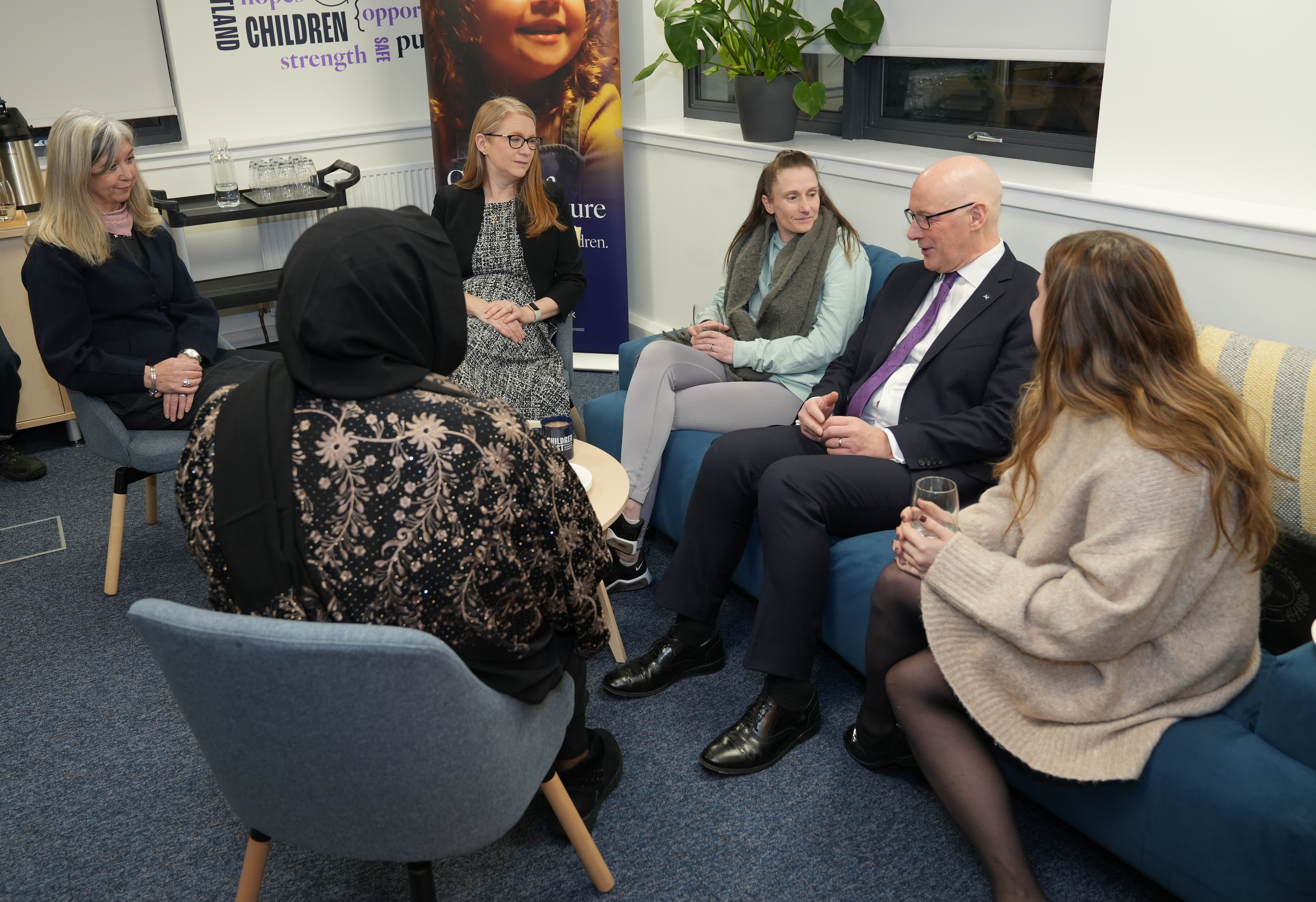
Mary Glasgow (left) introduces John Swinney, the First Minister, in 2026

In 1893 the Scottish Children's League of Pity was formed as a junior and fund-raising branch.

The NSPCC also began to come into existence around this time and now operates in England, Wales and Northern Ireland. Although the two charities are completely separate organisations, they work together to improve the lives of children and families throughout the UK.

In 2017 Mary Glasgow, who had been working for Children First since 2014, became the CEO.

== Name change ==
In 1921 the Scottish National Society received Royal Charter and became the Royal Scottish Society for Prevention of Cruelty to Children.

In its early incarnation the society was set up to rescue children living rough and begging on the streets, in later years the Society became better known for investigating child abuse and neglect.

In 1968 new legislation gave responsibility for investigating child abuse to local authority social work departments. As a result, the role of the Royal Scottish Society for Prevention of Cruelty to Children changed. However, it was some years before the charity changed its name to reflect this change in role, adopting the campaigning name Children 1st in 1995.

The charity further changed its name in 2024 to Children First.

== Children and family services ==
Today, Children First provides 46 services in 17 local authority areas as well as four national services including ParentLine Scotland which is the free, national telephone helpline for anyone with a concern about a child. Between April 2007 and March 2011 Children First operated ChildLine Scotland on behalf of the NSPCC.

Children First has pioneered the use of the Family Group Conference in Scotland, and also provides a befriending service "Bfriends", several local family support services, a number of abuse and trauma recovery services across Scotland, and the national Safeguarding in Sport service.

== Campaigns ==
Children First also campaigns and lobbies on behalf of children and young people in Scotland. The campaigning priorities of Children First build on the work of its services. The organisation is part of campaigning coalitions, including Children Are Unbeatable!, which campaigns for an end to physical punishment, and Justice for Children, which campaigns for better conditions for children giving evidence in court.

== Kilts for Kids ==
Kilts for Kids is a year-round fundraising event celebrating all things Scottish. Hamish the Highland Coo was launched as the mascot for this fundraising drive on 30 August 2012. Since 2008, thousands of people have taken part in Kilts for Kids organising their own Scottish-themed fundraising event.

The first Kilts for Kids event was launched in Glasgow on 19 September 2008 with the support of media personality Kaye Adams, and comedians Karen Dunbar and Sanjeev Singh Kohli.
