= Aylesford, Nova Scotia =

Aylesford
- Village
- Location of Aylesford, Nova Scotia
- Coordinates: 45°02′0″N 64°50′00″W
- Country: Canada
- Province: Nova Scotia
- County: Kings
- Electoral Districts Federal: West Nova
- Provincial: Kings West
- Elevation: 32 m (105 ft)

Population (2021)
  - Total: 834
- Time zone: UTC-4 (AST)
  - Summer (DST): UTC-3 (ADT)
- Canadian Postal code: B0P 1C0
- Area code: 902 782
- Telephone Exchange: 847
- NTS Map: 021H02
- GNBC Code: CABCE

Aylesford, is a village situated in western Kings County in the Annapolis Valley of Nova Scotia, Canada. The settlement was named after the fourth Earl of Aylesford, Heneage Finch, who was Lord Of The Bedchamber to George III from 1772-1777. The community is located between the North and South Mountains, and is roughly a 15 minute drive to Canadian Forces Base Greenwood, and a 10 minute drive to its closest neighbour, the Town Of Berwick. Aylesford is located on the Evangeline Trail (Trunk 1) scenic tourist route, which was named after the epic 1847 H.W. Longfellow poem entitled Evangeline, A Tale of Acadie.

== History ==
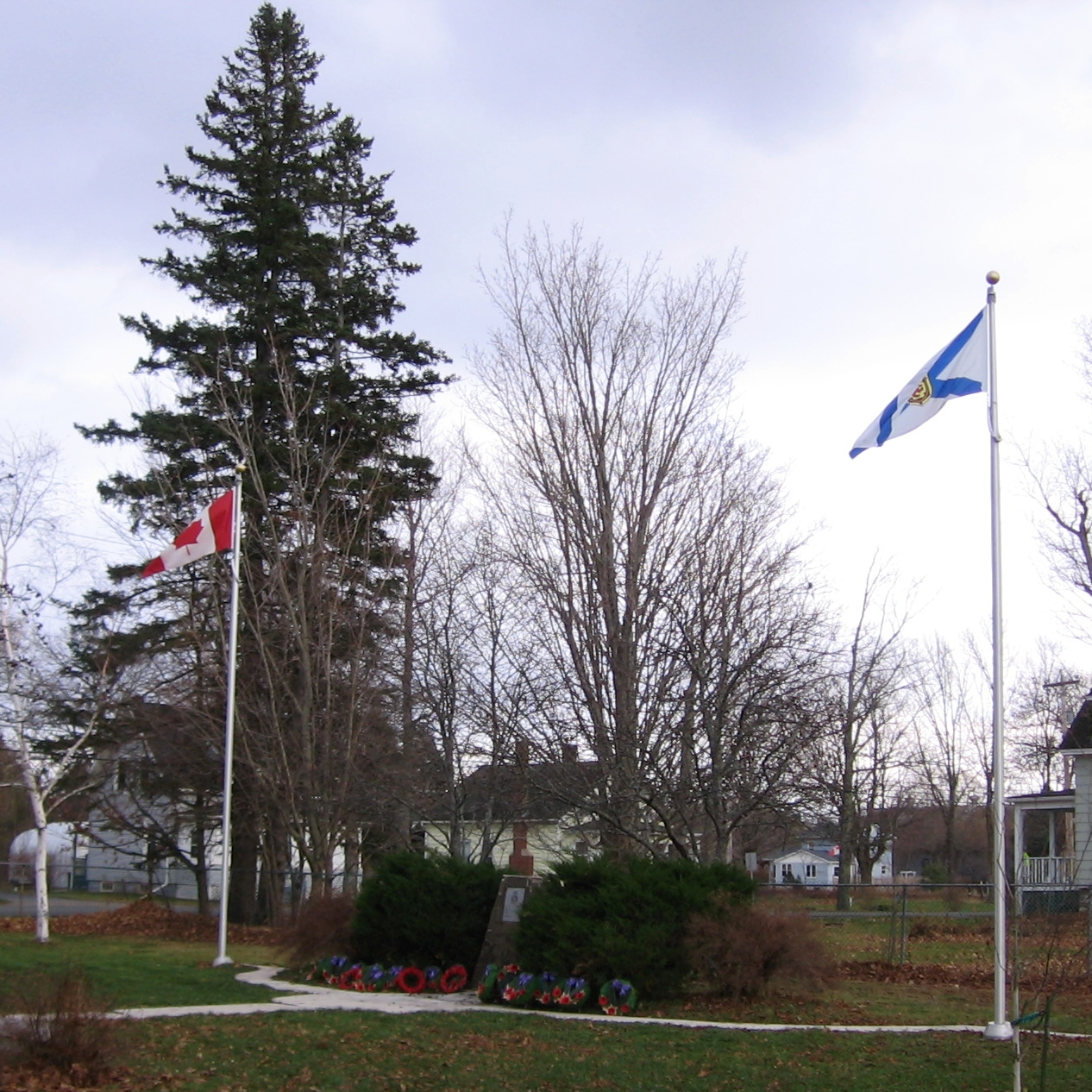
Aylesford Cenotaph

Aylesford is one of the oldest surviving settlements in Kings County, originally settled by Ulster Scots (Scots-Irish) during the early 1770s. Between 1772 and 1781, the population of Nova Scotia actually fell - from 19,000 to 12,000 - but by 1784, after the continued arrival of United Empire Loyalists during the American Revolution, the population had reached 32,000. A number of Loyalists, aka "The King’s Loyal Americans" put down roots in Aylesford and the surrounding area. Aylesford emerged as a major centre for packing, processing and exporting apples after the arrival of the Windsor and Annapolis Railway in 1869.

== Demographics ==
In the 2021 Census of Population conducted by Statistics Canada, Aylesford had a population of 834 living in 399 of its 428 total private dwellings, a change of 0.1% from its 2016 population of 833. With a land area of 4.08 km^{2} (1.58 sq mi), it had a population density of 204.4/km^{2} (529.4/sq mi) in 2021.

== Economy ==
Aylesford's economy relies primarily on the local agricultural industry. It is a service centre for the surrounding agricultural district. An important crop is cranberries cultivated on the extensive peat bogs. Peat moss harvesting operations are also active.

Aylesford's largest tourist attraction, the Oaklawn Farm Zoo (located just outside the village in Millville), was home to Rutledge, the heaviest living lion in captivity, as certified by Guinness World Records in 1997. Rutledge died in February 2009, three months short of his 18th birthday. The zoo also has a variety of other animals including tigers, dromedary camels, and a variety of monkeys. Other attractions in Aylesford include a public beach at Aylesford Lake, Crystal Falls hiking trail, and Clairemont Provincial park.

A farm called Dempsey's Corner has a fee-based self-pick service for fruits and vegetables. They also have a petting zoo and educate their visitors on the history of farming. Many other area farms provide a self-pick service offering strawberries, apples, pears, cherries, blueberries, raspberries, peaches and other produce.

There is also an Elementary School, St. Mary's Elementary (grades from primary to 5), along with West Kings District High School (grades 9-12). The Middle School youth attend Pine Ridge Middle School in neighbouring Kingston.

== Notable residents ==
- Emma Maitland Stirling, philanthropist

== See also ==
- Devil's Goose Pasture
