= Elmvale =

- Unincorporated Community
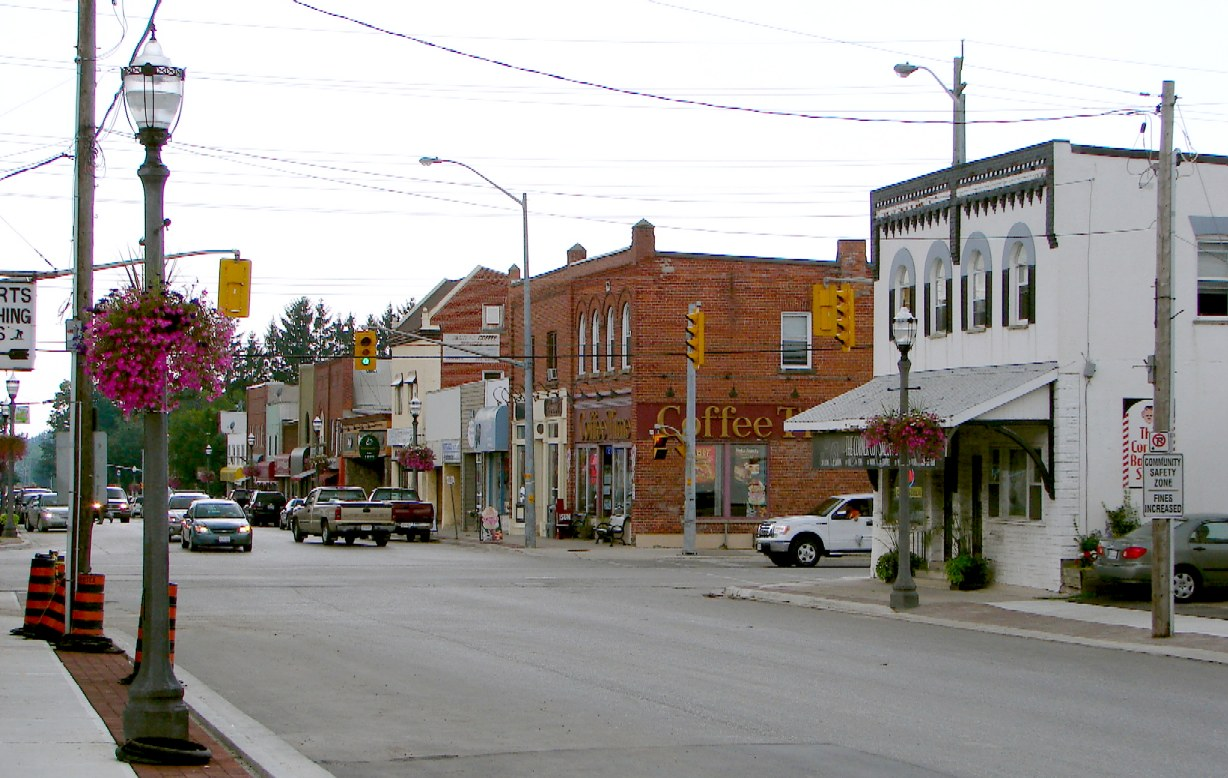
- Elmvale, in 2010

- Location within Ontario Location within Canada
- Coordinates: 44°35′1″N 79°51′57″W
- Country: Canada
- Province: Ontario
- County: Simcoe County

Area
  - Land: 1.91 km^{2} (0.74 sq mi)

Population (2016)
  - Total: 2,314
  - Density: 1,214/km^{2} (3,140/sq mi)
- Time zone: UTC−05:00 (EST)
  - Summer (DST): UTC−04:00 (EDT)
- Area code: 705

Elmvale is a rural town in Springwater Township, Ontario, Canada. It is located at the intersection of County Road 27 and County Road 92 (Queen Street), 20 minutes north of Barrie. Elmvale is home to 2,314 people, as of 2016.

== History ==
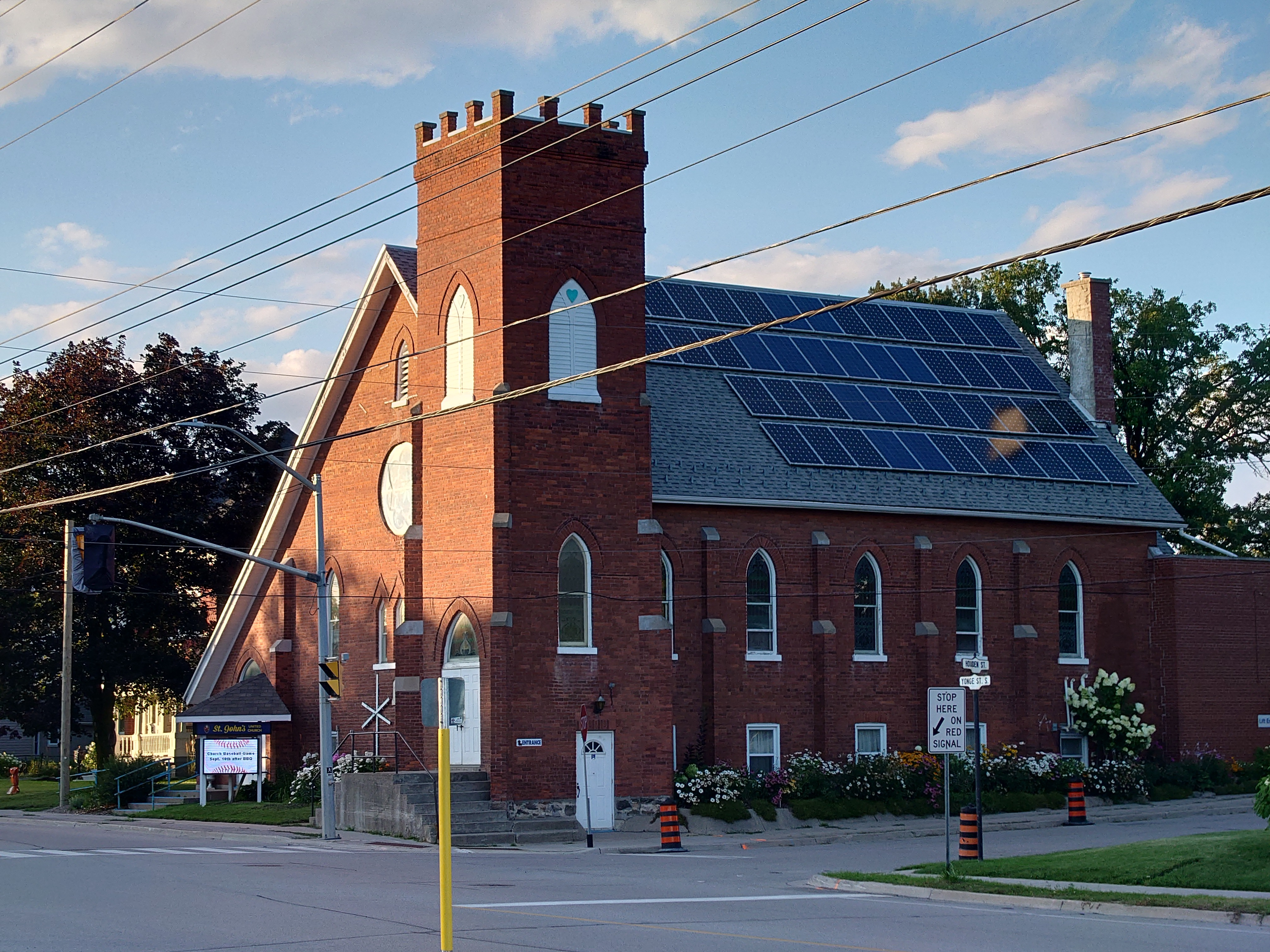
St. John's United Church

Elmvale first got its name when the post office opened in 1859. It had previously been known as Four Corners, Elm Flats, and Saurin.

On June 2, 1998 a tornado struck Elmvale, but caused no serious damage. On May 21, 2003, a confirmed F0 tornado struck Elmvale. Minor damage was reported to a barn roof and silo, and around 65 mature trees were uprooted.

== Schools ==
In 1877 Elmvale's two-story brick school which was partitioned to include secondary classes. The largest schools in Elmvale are the Huronia Centennial Public School and the Elmvale District High School. They are both part of the Simcoe County District School Board. The public school has one of the few marching bands in Ontario.

== Overview and events ==
- Identified in 2011 as having the purest water in the world, it has been studied for decades and proven to have one fifth the lead contaminants that even the cleanest layer of ice in the arctic has. Even more impressive is the fact that those ice layers are thousands of years old, predating atmospheric lead pollution.
- The Elmvale Water Festival runs each fall to raise awareness for water-quality issues in local politics and agriculture.
- The Elmvale Maple Syrup Festival draws thousands of visitors each year, and dates back to 1966. There are sugarbush rides, treats at the SugarShack, and many pancakes. The festival regularly attracts visitors from across the province and beyond, and generates thousands of dollars of funding for local community projects each year.
- The Elmvale Fall Fair runs each October.
- The Elmvale Flea and Farmers Market, located on Hwy 92, is one of Ontario's largest independent flea markets
- Elmvale is also home to the Elmvale Jungle Zoo, which hosts 300 animals.

== Transportation ==
Elmvale is served by the Simcoe County LINX inter-community bus service on its Route 1 - Penetanguishene / Midland to Barrie.
