= Okanagan Game Farm =

- Interactive map of Okanagan Game Farm
- 49°24′2″N 119°36′31″W
- Date opened: June 22, 1967
- Date closed: March 31, 1999
- Location: Kaleden, British Columbia, Canada
- Land area: 270 hectares (667 acres)
- No. of animals: 1,200

The Okanagan Game Farm was a private zoo located in Kaleden, British Columbia, a small community approximately 8 kilometres (5.0 mi) south of Penticton, British Columbia. The park closed on March 31, 1999, after 33 years in operation.

== History ==
The Okanagan Game Farm opened on June 22, 1967, after a group of thirty shareholders agreed to invest $200,000 in the Farm on 270 hectares of land leased from the Penticton Indian Band in the small community of Kaleden, British Columbia.

At one time, the Okanagan Game Farm had over 130 species of animals, with a head count of over 1,200. The species included Siberian tigers, rhinos, giraffes, bears, zebras, wolves, bighorn sheep and numerous reptiles and birds. The Farm covered over 667 acres (270 ha) and had a petting zoo and many learning centers. The Farm closed on March 31, 1999.
