= Millville, Nova Scotia =

Community in Nova Scotia, Canada

Millville
- Location within Nova Scotia
- Coordinates: 44°59′46″N 64°49′4″W
- Country: Canada
- Province: Nova Scotia

Millville is a community in the Canadian province of Nova Scotia, located in Kings County.
