= List of zoos by country =

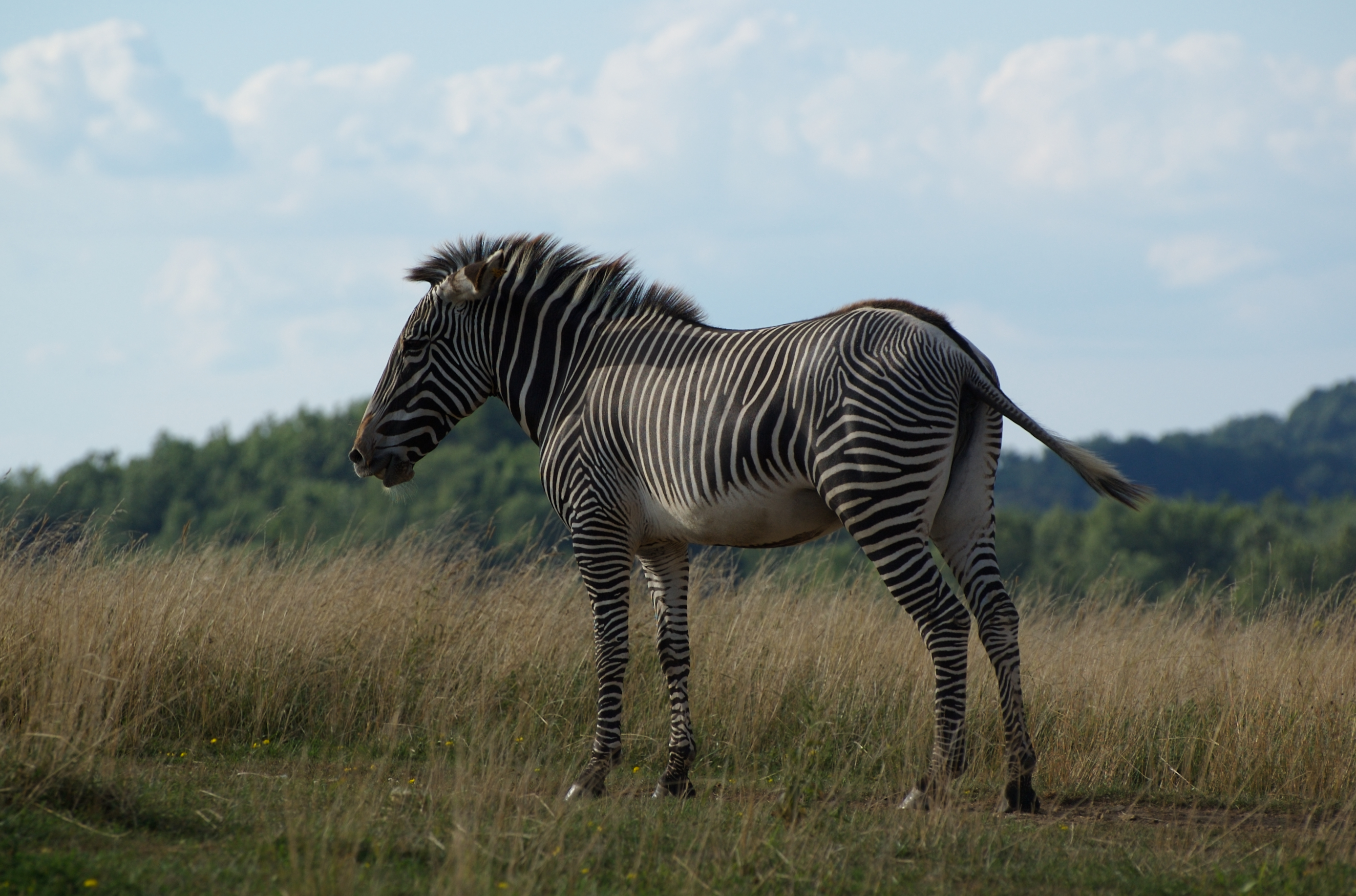
At 9,154 acres (3,704 hectares), The Wilds in the United States is considered the largest facility in the world.

This is a list of zoological gardens (zoos) around the world. For aquaria, see List of aquaria. For dolphinariums, see List of dolphinariums. For an annotated list of defunct zoos and aquariums, see List of former zoos and aquariums.

Zoos are primarily facilities where animals are kept within enclosures and displayed to the public, and in which they may also be bred. Such facilities include zoos, safari parks, animal theme parks, aviaries, butterfly zoos and reptile centers, as well as wildlife sanctuaries and nature reserves where visitors are allowed. According to the Association of Zoos and Aquariums (AZA), there are over 10,000 zoos worldwide. Globally there are an estimated 700 million visitors a year to zoos.

== Africa ==
=== Algeria ===
- Zoo de Ben Aknoun - Algiers
- Animal Park - Kissir El Aouana - El Aouana
- Oran Zoo - Oran

=== Cameroon ===
- Mvog-Betsi Zoo – Yaoundé

=== Congo, Democratic Republic of the ===
- Kinshasa Zoological Garden - Kinshasa
- Parc Zoologique de Lubumbashi - Lubumbashi

=== Congo, Republic of the ===
- Brazzaville Zoo - Brazzaville

=== Ivory Coast ===
- Abidjan Zoo - Abidjan

=== Egypt ===
- Giza Zoo - Giza
- Alexandria Zoo - Alexandria
- Africa Safari Park
- Beni Suef Zoo
- Fayoum Zoo

=== Ethiopia ===
- Addis Ababa Lion Zoo

=== Ghana ===
- Kumasi Zoo
- Accra Zoo

=== Kenya ===
- Haller Park – Bamburi, Mombasa

=== Libya ===
- Benghazi Zoo
- Tripoli Zoo

=== Madagascar ===
- Tsimbazaza Zoo – Antananarivo
- Lemurs' Park – near Antananarivo
- Parc Ivoloina – near Toamasina

=== Malawi ===
- Lilongwe Wildlife Centre

=== Mali ===
- Bamako Zoo

=== Mauritius ===
- Casela Nature Park
- La Vanille Nature Park

=== Morocco ===
- Rabat Zoo
- Dream Village zoo
- Parc Sindibad zoo

=== Mozambique ===
- Maputo Zoo

=== Nigeria ===
- Jos Wildlife Park
- Ogba Zoo – Benin City
- Port Harcourt Zoo
- Abuja Children's Zoo
- Kano Zoo
- FUNAAB Zoo Park – Abeokuta
- Ibadan University Zoo
- Sanda Kyarimi Park Zoo – Maiduguri

=== Senegal ===
- Hann Zoological Park – Dakar

=== South Africa ===
- Birds of Eden
- East London Zoo
- Emerald Zoo Vanderbijlpark
- Hartebeesport Dam Snake and Animal Park
- Johannesburg Zoo
- Lory Park Zoo
- Mitchell Park Zoo – Durban
- Mystic Monkeys and Feathers Wildlife Park
- National Zoo – Pretoria
- Umgeni River Bird Park – Durban
- World of Birds Wildlife Sanctuary and Monkey Park – Cape Town

=== Tanzania ===
- Dar es Salaam Zoo

=== Tunisia ===
- Tunis Zoo
- Friguia Park– Bouficha

=== Uganda ===
- Uganda Wildlife Education Centre – Entebbe

=== Zambia ===
- Munda Wanga Environmental Park – Lusaka

== Asia ==
=== Afghanistan ===
- Kabul Zoo

=== Armenia ===
- Yerevan Zoo

=== Azerbaijan ===
- Baku Zoo

=== Bangladesh ===
- List of zoos in Bangladesh

=== Cambodia ===
- Phnom Tamao Wildlife Rescue Centre
- Phnom Penh Safari

=== China ===
- Badaling Safari World
- Beijing Zoo
- Bifengxia Wild Animal Park
- Changsha Ecological Zoo
- Chengdu Zoo
- Chongqing Zoo
- Dalian Forest Zoo
- Guangzhou Panyu Chime-long Night Zoo
- Guangzhou Xiangjian Safari Park
- Guangzhou Zoo
- Hangzhou Zoo
- Harbin Northern Forest Zoo
- Harbin Siberian Tiger Park
- Harbin Zoo
- Hongshan Forest Zoo
- Jinan Safari Park
- Jinan Zoo
- Kashgar Zoo, People's Park
- Kunming Zoo
- Nanjing Hongshan Forest Zoo
- Nanning Zoo
- Qingdao Forest Wildlife World
- Qingdao Zoo
- Qinhuangdao Wildlife Park
- Shanghai Wild Animal Park
- Shanghai Zoo
- Shenzhen Safari Park
- Shijiazhuang Zoo
- Suzhou Zoo
- Tianjin Zoo
- Urumqi Zoo
- Yancheng Wild Animal World
- Zhengzhou Zoo
- Zhoukou Safari Park

=== Georgia ===
- Tbilisi Zoo

=== Hong Kong ===
- Bird Lake and the Aviary (Kowloon Park)
- Edward Youde Aviary (Hong Kong Park)
- Hong Kong Wetland Park
- Hong Kong Zoological and Botanical Gardens
- Kadoorie Farm and Botanic Garden
- Ocean Park Hong Kong
- The Reptile House (Tuen Mun Park)

=== India ===
- List of zoos in India

=== Indonesia ===
- Bali Bird Park
- Bali Safari and Marine Park, Gianyar, Bali
- Bali Zoo – Singapadu, Bali
- Bandung Zoo – Bandung, West Java
- Batu Secret Zoo – Batu, East Java
- Fauna Land at Ancol Dreamland – Ancol, Jakarta
- Gembira Loka Zoo – Yogyakarta
- Lembang Park & Zoo – Lembang, Bandung
- Maharani Zoo & Goa – Lamongan, East Java
- Medan Zoo – Medan, North Sumatera
- Ragunan Zoo – Jakarta
- Solo Safari - Surakarta, Central Java
- Surabaya Zoo - Surabaya, East Java
- Taman Mini Indonesia Indah - Jakarta
- Taman Safari-Bogor, West Java, Prigen-Pasuruan, East Java

=== Iran ===
- Bandar Abbas Bird Garden
- Bird Garden of Isfahan
- Tehran Zoological Garden
- Vakil Abad Zoo – Mashhad
- Isfahan Zoo

=== Iraq ===
- Baghdad Zoo
- Erbil Zoo

=== Israel ===
- Biblical Museum of Natural History
- Carmel Hai-Bar Nature Reserve
- Haifa Zoo
- Hai Kef – Rishon LeZion
- Hai Park – Kiryat Motzkin
- Nahariya Zoo-Botanical Garden
- Gan Garoo – Nir David
- Petah Tikva Zoo
- Ramat Gan Safari
- Tisch Family Biblical Zoological Gardens - Jerusalem
- Yotvata Hai-Bar Nature Reserve

=== Japan ===
- List of zoos in Japan

=== Kazakhstan ===
- Almaty Zoo
- Karaganda Zoo
- Shymkent Zoo

=== South Korea ===
- Dalseong Park – Daegu
- Everland Zoo-topia – Yongin
- Seoul Children's Zoo – Seoul
- Seoul Grand Park Zoo – Gwacheon

=== Macau ===
- Flora Garden
- Macao Giant Panda Pavilion – Seac Pai Van Park

=== Malaysia ===
- A'Famosa Animal World Safari – Alor Gajah, Malacca
- Jong's Crocodile Farm and Zoo – Kuching, Sarawak
- Kemaman Zoo and Recreation Park – Kemaman, Terengganu
- Kuala Krai mini zoo – Kuala Krai, Kelantan
- Kuala Lumpur Bird Park – Kuala Lumpur
- Kuala Lumpur Deer Park – Kuala Lumpur
- Crocodile Adventureland Langkawi – Langkawi, Kedah
- Langkawi Wildlife Park – Langkawi, Kedah
- Lok Kawi Wildlife Park – Lok Kawi, Sabah
- Lost World of Tambun – Ipoh, Perak
- Malacca Crocodile Farm – Ayer Keroh, Malacca
- Malacca Zoo – Ayer Keroh, Malacca
- Miri Crocodile Farm cum Mini Zoo
- National Zoo of Malaysia (Zoo Negara) – Ulu Klang, Kuala Lumpur
- Sandakan Crocodile Farm – Sandakan, Sabah
- Snake and Reptile Farm – Perlis
- Sunway Lagoon – Subang Jaya, Selangor
- Taiping Zoo – Taiping, Perak
- Zoo Teruntum – Taman Teruntum, Pahang

=== Myanmar ===
- Naypyidaw Zoological Gardens
- Yadanabon Zoological Gardens – Mandalay
- Yangon Zoo

=== Nepal ===
- Central Zoo, Jawalakhel
- Banbatika Zoo
- Pokhara Zoological park

=== Pakistan ===
- List of zoos in Pakistan

=== Palestinian territories ===
- Qalqilya Zoo – West Bank

=== Philippines ===
- Albay Park and Wildlife – Legazpi, Albay
- Avilon Zoo – Rodriguez, Rizal
- Baluarte Zoo – Vigan, Ilocos Sur
- Botolan Wildlife Farm – San Juan, Botolan, Zambales
- Crocolandia Foundation – Biasong, Talisay, Cebu
- Davao Crocodile Park – Diversion Highway, Ma-a, Davao City
- Eden Nature Park and Resort – Toril, Davao City
- Laguna Wildlife Park and Rescue Center – La Vista Pansol Complex, Pansol, Calamba, Laguna
- Malabon Zoo and Aquarium – Governor Pascual Street, Potrero, Malabon
- Manila Zoological and Botanical Garden – M. Adriatico Street, Malate, Manila
- Mari-it Wildlife and Conservation Park – Lambunao, Iloilo
- Negros Forests & Ecological Foundation – South Capitol Road, Bacolod, Negros Occidental
- Ninoy Aquino Parks & Wildlife Center – Diliman, Quezon City
- Palawan Wildlife Rescue and Conservation Center – Irawan, Puerto Princesa, Palawan
- ParadiZoo – Mendez, Cavite
- Pasig Rainforest Park
- RACSO'S Woodland Mini-Hotel and Wildlife Resort – Rizal-Tuguisan, Guimbal, Iloilo
- Residence Inn Mini Zoo (ZooRi) – Barrio Neogan, Tagaytay, Cavite
- Zoo Paradise of the World – Zamboanguita, Negros Oriental
- Zoobic Safari – Subic, Zambales
- Zoocobia Fun Zoo – Clark Freeport Zone, Angeles, Pampanga

=== Qatar ===
- Al Khor Family Park and Zoo
- Al Dosari Zoo and Game Reserve

=== Saudi Arabia ===
- Riyadh Zoo

=== Singapore ===
- Bird Paradise
- Night Safari
- River Wonders
- Singapore Zoo

=== Sri Lanka ===
- National Zoological Gardens of Sri Lanka
- Pinnawala Open Zoo
- Ridiyagama Safari Park

=== Taiwan ===
- Fonghuanggu Bird and Ecology Park
- Green World Ecological Farm
- Hsinchu Zoo
- Leefoo Village Theme park and zoo
- Shoushan Zoo
- Taipei Zoo
- Wanpi World Safari Zoo

=== Thailand ===
- Chiang Mai Night Safari
- Chiang Mai Zoo
- Khao Kheow Open Zoo
- Khao Suan Kwang Zoo – Khon Kaen
- Lopburi Zoo
- Nakhon Ratchasima Zoo
- Pata Zoo
- Phuket Bird Park
- Safari Park Kanchanaburi
- Safari World
- Samphran Elephant Ground & Zoo
- Samui Aquarium & Tiger Zoo
- Songkhla Zoo
- The Million Years Park and Pattaya Crocodile Farm

=== Turkey ===
- Darica Zoo – Istanbul
- Eskişehir Zoo
- Gaziantep Zoo
- İzmir Wildlife Park
- Polonezköy Animal Park
- Bursa Zoo
- Tarsus Zoo

=== Turkmenistan ===
- Ashgabat Zoo

=== United Arab Emirates ===
- Al Ain Zoo
- Al Hefaiyah Conservation Centre
- Sharjah Desert Park
- Dubai Safari Park
- Emirates Park Zoo – Abu Dhabi
- RAK Zoo – Ras Al Khaimah
- The Green Planet – Dubai

=== Uzbekistan ===
- Tashkent Zoo
- Termiz Zoo

=== Vietnam ===
- Thu Le Park zoo – Hanoi
- Saigon Zoo and Botanical Gardens – Ho Chi Minh City

=== Yemen ===
- Sana'a Zoo
- Ta'izz Zoo

== Australasia/Oceania ==
=== Australia ===
- List of zoos in Australia

=== Fiji ===
- Kula Wild Adventure Park – Sigatoka

=== Guam ===
- Guam Zoo – Tumon

=== New Caledonia ===
- Parc Forestier de Nouméa – Nouméa

=== New Zealand ===
- Auckland Zoo – Auckland
- Brooklands Zoo – New Plymouth
- Hamilton Zoo – Hamilton
- Kiwi Park – Queenstown
- Natureland Wildlife Trust - Nelson
- Orana Wildlife Park – Christchurch
- Wellington Zoo – Wellington
- Willowbank Wildlife Reserve – Christchurch

=== Papua New Guinea ===
- Port Moresby Nature Park
- Rainforest Habitat – Lae

== Europe ==
=== Albania ===
- Tirana Zoo

=== Austria ===
- Alpenzoo Innsbruck
- Haus des Meeres – Vienna
- Salzburg Zoo
- Schloss Herberstein Zoo and Nature Park – Schloss Herberstein, Styria
- Schmiding Zoo – Krenglbach
- Tiergarten Schönbrunn – Vienna
- Tiergarten Walding – Walding, Upper Austria

=== Belarus ===
- Grodno Zoo
- Minsk Zoo

=== Belgium ===
- Antwerp Zoo
- Bellewaerde – Ypres
- Le Monde Sauvage – Aywaille
- Pairi Daiza – Brugelette, Hainaut
- Pakawi Park – Olmen, Mol
- Parc animalier de Bouillon
- Planckendael Zoo – Muizen, Mechelen

=== Bosnia and Herzegovina ===
- Pionirska dolina – Sarajevo
- Zoo vrt Bingo – Tuzla

=== Bulgaria ===
- Lovech Zoo
- Pleven Zoo
- Sofia Zoo
- Stara Zagora Zoo
- Varna Zoo

=== Croatia ===
- Bizik family Zoo – Našice
- Milec family Zoo – Ruščica
- Split Zoo
- Osijek Zoo
- Zagreb Zoo

=== Cyprus ===
- Limassol Zoo
- Mazotos Camel Park
- Melios Zoo Nicosia
- Paphos Zoo

=== Denmark ===
- Aalborg Zoo
- Copenhagen Zoo – Frederiksberg
- Crocodile Zoo – Eskilstrup
- Givskud Zoo
- Jesperhus – Nykøbing Mors
- Odense Zoo
- Randers Tropical Zoo
- Ree Park Safari – Ebeltoft
- Skandinavisk Dyrepark – Djursland

=== Estonia ===
- Tallinn Zoo – Tallinn (1939)
- Elistvere Animal Park – Elistvere, Jõgeva County

=== Finland ===
- Ähtäri Zoo
- Escurial Zoo and Flower Park
- Kitee Zoo
- Korkeasaari Zoo – Helsinki (1889)
- Kuopio Zoo
- Orimattilan kotieläinpuisto – Orimattila
- PikkuKili – Lieksa
- Ranua Zoo – Ranua
- Särkänniemi Children's Zoo – Tampere
- Tropicario – Helsinki
- Zoolandia – Lieto

=== France ===
- Alligator Bay - Beauvoir
- Biotropica, les jardins animaliers - Val-de-Reuil
- Citadel of Besançon – Besançon
- Cleres Zoological Park – Clères
- Haute Touche Zoological Park – Obterre
- Jardin Zoologique de la Tête d'or – Parc de la Tête d'or, Lyon
- Jardin d'Oiseaux Tropicaux – La Londe-les-Maures
- La Bourbansais Zoo – Ille-et-Vilaine
- La Palmyre Zoo – Les Mathes
- La Vallée des Singes – Romagne
- Ménagerie du Jardin des Plantes – Paris
- Parc animalier de Sainte-Croix – Rhodes
- Parc Animalier d'Écouves - Le Bouillon
- Parc animalier Montaigu la Brisette - Montaigu-la-Brisette
- Parc des Félins – Nesles
- Parc des Oiseaux – Villars-les-Dombes
- Parc du Reynou - Le Vigen
- Parc Phœnix – Nice
- Parc zoologique de Champrepus - Champrepus
- Parc Zoologique de Lunaret – Montpellier
- Parc Zoologique et Botanique de Mulhouse – Mulhouse
- Paris Zoological Park, also known as Zoo de Vincennes – Paris
- Planete Sauvage (safari park) – Port-Saint-Père
- Pyrénées Animal Park
- Réserve Africaine de Sigean – Sigean
- Réserve Africaine & Parc Zoologique et Botanique de Thoiry – Thoiry
- Safari de Peaugres – Peaugres
- Zoo and Botanical Garden of Branféré – Le Guerno
- Zoo d'Amnéville – Amnéville
- Zoo de Cerza – Hermival-les-Vaux
- Zoo de Doué – Doué-la-Fontaine
- Zoo de Jurques - Dialan sur Chaîne
- Zoo de la Flèche – La Flèche
- Zoo des Sables - Les Sables-d'Olonne
- ZooParc de Beauval – Saint-Aignan-sur-Cher

=== Gibraltar ===
- Alameda Wildlife Conservation Park

=== Greece ===
- Attica Zoological Park – Athens
- Zoological Park of Thessaloniki – Thessaloniki

=== Hungary ===
- Bear Farm – Veresegyház
- Budakeszi Wildlife Park – Budakeszi
- Budapest Zoo & Botanical Garden – Budapest
- Debrecen Zoo and Amusement Park
- Gyöngyös Zoo
- Jászberény Zoo & Botanical Garden
- Kecskemét Wild Garden
- Kittenberger Kálmán Zoo & Botanical Garden – Veszprém
- Miskolc Zoo
- Pécs Zoo
- Sóstó Zoo – Nyíregyháza
- Szeged Wildlife Park
- Tisza-lake Ökocentrum – Poroszló
- Tropicarium – Budapest
- Xantus János Zoo – Győr

=== Ireland ===
- List of zoos and aquariums in Ireland

=== Italy ===
- 1° Parco Zoo della Fauna Europea – Poppi, Arezzo
- Bioparco di Roma – Rome
- Bioparco di Sicilia – Carini, Palermo
- Bioparco Faunistico d'Abruzzo – Castel di Sangro, L'Aquila
- Centro Faunistico Parco Gallorose – Cecina, Leghorn
- Città della Domenica – Perugia
- Faunistic Park Le Cornelle – Valbrembo, Bergamo
- Giardino Zoologico di Pistoia – Pistoia
- L'Oasi degli Animali – San Sebastiano Po, Turin
- Oasi di Sant'Alessio con Vialone – Sant'Alessio con Vialone, Pavia
- Parc Animalier d'Introd – Introd, Aosta
- Parco degli Angeli – Giba, Carbonia-Iglesias
- Parco dei Pappagalli – Latisana, Udine
- Parco della Villa Pallavicino – Stresa, Verbano-Cusio-Ossola
- Parco del Sole – Collazzone, Perugia
- Parco Faunistico Al Bosco – Grezzana, Verona
- Parco Faunistico Cappeller – Cartigliano, Vicenza
- Parco Faunistico La Torbiera – Agrate Conturbia, Novara
- Parco Faunistico Valcorba – Pozzonovo, Padua
- Parco Natura Viva – Bussolengo, Verona
- Parco Ornitologico Villa d'Orleans – Palermo
- Parco Safari delle Langhe – Murazzano, Cuneo
- Parco Zoo Falconara – Falconara Marittima, Ancona
- Parco Zoo La Rupe – Civitella Casanova, Pescara
- Parco Zoo Punta Verde – Lignano Sabbiadoro, Udine
- Safari Park d'Abruzzo – Rocca San Giovanni, Chieti
- Safari Park Pombia – Pombia, Novara
- Safari Ravenna – Ravenna
- Zoo Di Napoli – Naples
- Zoom Torino – Cumiana, Turin
- Zoosafari Fasanolandia – Fasano, Brindisi

=== Latvia ===
- Riga Zoo
- Latgales Zoo – Daugavpils
- Minizoo "Dobuļi" – Iecava Municipality

=== Lithuania ===
- Lithuanian Zoo – Kaunas

=== Moldova ===
- Chişinău Zoo, Chişinău

=== Monaco ===
- Zoological Garden of Monaco

=== Netherlands ===
- Apenheul – Apeldoorn
- Artis – Amsterdam
- BestZoo – Best
- Burgers' Zoo – Arnhem
- Dierenpark de Oliemeulen – Tilburg
- DierenPark Amersfoort
- Dierenrijk – Mierlo
- Diergaarde Blijdorp, Rotterdam
- Dolfinarium Harderwijk
- GaiaZOO – Kerkrade
- Ouwehands Dierenpark – Rhenen
- Safaripark Beekse Bergen – Hilvarenbeek
- Taman Indonesia – Kallenkote
- Uilen- en Dierenpark De Paay – Beesd
- Vogelpark Avifauna – Alphen aan den Rijn
- Wildlands Adventure Zoo – Emmen
- Zoo Park Overloon

=== North Macedonia ===
- Skopje Zoo
- Bitola Zoo

=== Norway ===
- Bjørneparken - Flå Municipality
- Den lille dyrehage – Sundebru in Gjerstad Municipality
- Haugaland zoo – Torvastad in Karmøy Municipality
- Kristiansand Zoo and Amusement Park - Kristiansand Municipality
- Oslo reptilpark - Oslo Municipality
- Polar Park – Salangsdalen in Bardu Municipality

=== Poland ===
- Akcent Zoo Białystok – Białystok
- Fokarium na Helu – Hel
- Kraków Zoo – Kraków
- Ogród Zoologiczny w Łodzi – Łódź
- Ogród Zoologiczny w Płocku – Płock
- Miejski Ogród Zoologiczny Wybrzeża w Gdańsku-Oliwie – Gdańsk
- New Zoo in Poznań
- Ogród Fauny Polskiej- zoo w Bydgoszczy – Bydgoszcz
- Ogród Ornitologiczny w Łebie- Bird Park in Łeba – Łeba
- Ogród Zoologiczny Canpol w Sieroczynie k. Człuchowa – Człuchów
- Ogród Zoologiczny Dolina Charlotty w Strzelinku k. Słupska – Słupsk
- Old Zoo in Poznań
- Opole Zoo – Opole
- Park Dzikich Zwierząt (Wild Animal Park) Kadzidłowo – Kadzidłowo
- Silesian Zoological Garden – Chorzów
- Warsaw Zoo – Warsaw
- Wrocław Zoo – Wrocław
- Zamość Zoo – Zamość
- Ogród Zoobotaniczny w Toruniu – Toruń
- ZOO FARMA w Łącznej – Łączna- Mieroszów
- Zoo Safari Borysew – Borysew- Poddębice
- Zoo Safari Świerkocin – Świerkocin
- Zoo w Braniewie – Braniewo
- Zoo w Nowym Tomyślu – Nowy Tomyśl

=== Portugal ===
- Badoca Safari Park – Vila Nova de Santo André
- Lisbon Zoo – Lisbon
- Parque Biológico de Gaia – Vila Nova de Gaia
- Parque Zoológico de Lagos – Lagos
- Zoo da Maia – Maia
- Zoo de Lourosa – Lourosa
- Zoo Santo Inácio
- Zoomarine – Albufeira, Algarve

=== Romania ===
- Brăila Zoological Garden – Brăila
- Brașov Zoological Garden – Brașov
- Călărași Zoological Garden – Călărași
- Craiova Zoological Garden – Craiova
- Galați Zoological Garden – Galați
- Zoo Hunedoara – Hunedoara
- Oradea Zoological Garden – Oradea
- Pitești Zoological Garden – Pitești
- Ploiești Zoological Garden – Ploiești
- Târgoviște Zoological Garden – Târgoviște
- Zoo Băneasa – Bucharest
- Zoo Bârlad – Bârlad
- Zoo Sibiu – Sibiu
- Grădina Zoologică din Târgu Mureș – Târgu Mureș

=== Russia ===
- Abakan Wildlife Center – Abakan
- Cheboksary Zoo – Cheboksary
- Chelyabinsk Zoo – Chelyabinsk
- Chita Zoo – Chita
- Ekaterinburg Zoo – Ekaterinburg
- Ivanovo Zoo – Ivanovo
- Izhevsk Zoo – Izhevsk
- Kaliningrad Zoo – Kaliningrad
- Kazan Zoo – Kazan
- Khabarovsk Zoo – Khabarovsk
- Krasnoyarsk park of Flora and Fauna "Roev Ruchei" – Krasnoyarsk
- Leningrad Zoo – Saint Petersburg
- Lipetsk Zoo – Lipetsk
- Moscow Zoo – Moscow
- Novosibirsk Zoo – Novosibirsk
- Omsk Zoo – Bolsherech'e, Omsk
- Penza Zoo – Penza
- Perm Zoo – Perm
- Rostov Zoo – Rostov-on-Don
- Sakhalin Zoological and Botanic Park – Yuzhno-Sakhalinsk
- Samara Zoo – Samara
- Tula Exotarium – Tula
- Yakutsk Zoo – Yakutsk

=== Serbia ===
- Belgrade Zoo – Belgrade
- Bor Zoo – Bor
- Jagodina Zoo – Jagodina
- Palić Zoo – Palić
- Zoo Miki – Kolut
- Zoo Park Koki – Inđija

=== Slovakia ===
- Bojnice Zoo – Bojnice
- Bratislava Zoo – Bratislava
- Košice Zoo – Košice
- Spišská Nová Ves Zoo – Spišská Nová Ves

=== Slovenia ===
- Ljubljana Zoo – Ljubljana

=== Spain ===
- Avifauna (núcleo zoológico) Zoo – Lugo
- Barcelona Zoo – Barcelona
- Cabarceno Natural Park – Cantabria
- Las Águilas Jungle Park – Tenerife
- Loro Parque – Tenerife
- Maroparque – La Palma
- Monkey Park (Tenerife) – Tenerife
- Mundomar – Benidorm
- Parque de la Naturaleza de Cabárceno – Obregón
- Parque Zoológico de Guadalajara – Guadalajara
- Parque Zoológico y Jardín Botánico Alberto Durán – Jerez de la Frontera
- Rancho Texas Park – Lanzarote
- Terra Natura – Benidorm
- Terra Natura – Murcia
- Valencia Bioparc – Valencia
- Zoo Aquarium de Madrid – Madrid
- Zoo de Fuengirola – Málaga
- Zoo de Santillana – Santillana del Mar
- Zoo de Sevilla – Seville

=== Sweden ===
- Borås Djurpark – Borås
- Furuviksparken – Gävle
- Grönåsen Älg- och Lantdjurspark – Kosta
- Järvzoo – Järvsö
- Junsele Djurpark – Junsele
- Kolmården Wildlife Park –
- Lycksele Zoo – Lycksele
- Nordens Ark – Bohuslän
- Öland Zoo and Amusement Park – Färjestaden, Öland
- Parken Zoo – Eskilstuna
- Skånes Djurpark – Höör
- Skansen– Stockholm
- Slottsskogens djurpark – Gothenburg
- Ystad Djurpark – Ystad

=== Switzerland ===
- Knies Kinderzoo – Rapperswil
- Le Bois du Petit Chateau – La Chaux-de-Fonds
- Tierpark Dählhölzli – Bern
- Natur- und Tierpark Goldau – Goldau
- Tierpark Lange Erlen – Basel
- Wildpark Bruderhaus – Winterthur
- Wildpark Langenberg – Langnau am Albis
- Wildpark Peter und Paul – St. Gallen
- Zoo Basel – Basel
- Zoo La Garenne – Le Vaud
- Zürich Zoologischer Garten – Zürich

=== Ukraine ===
- Cherkasy Zoo
- Feldman Ecopark
- Kharkiv Zoo
- Kyiv Zoo
- Lutsk Zoo
- Mena Zoo
- Mykolaiv Zoo
- Odesa Zoo
- Rivne Zoo
- Vinnytsia Zoo

=== United Kingdom ===
- List of zoological gardens and aquariums in United Kingdom

== North America ==
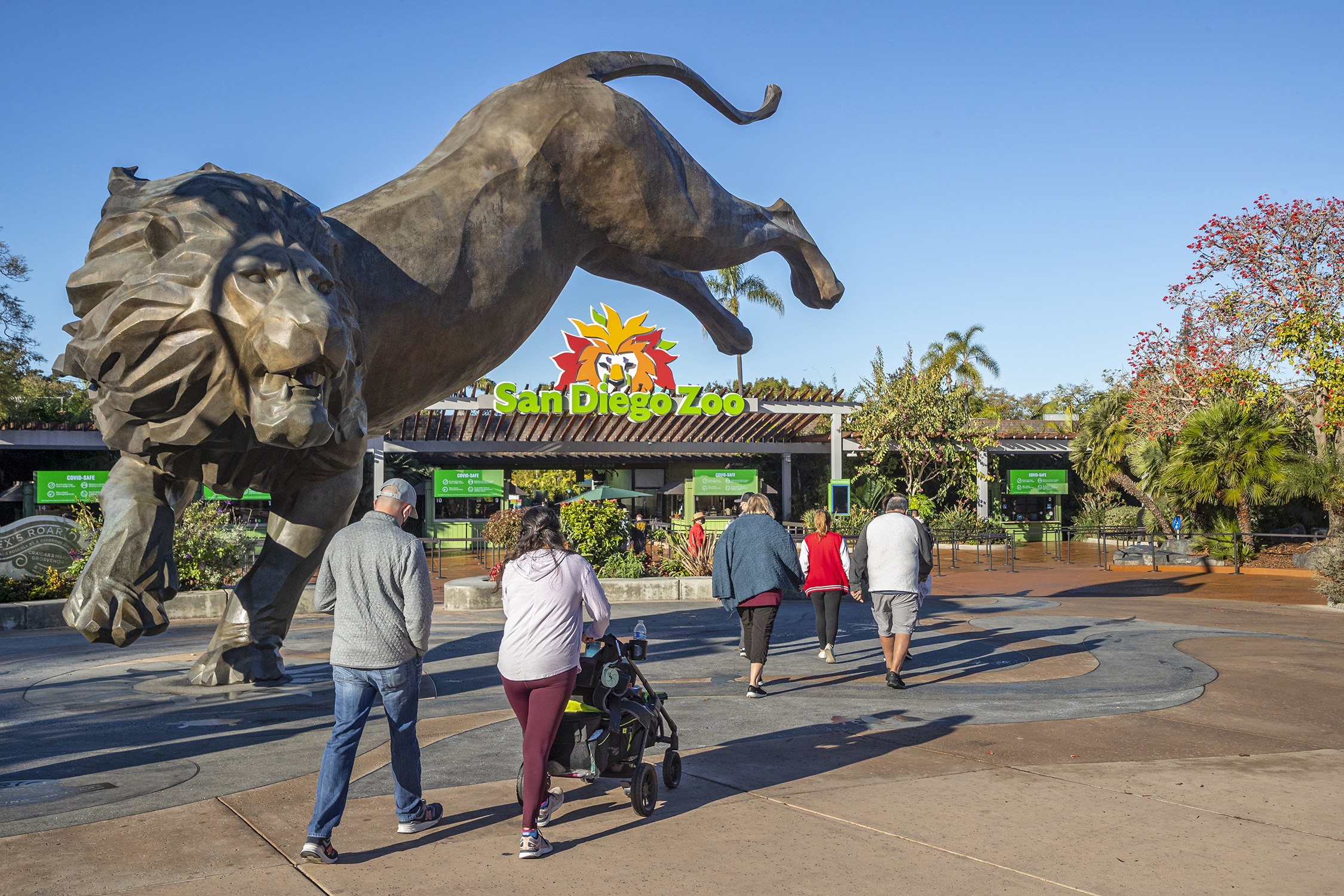
Entrance to the San Diego Zoo, generally considered one of the best zoos in the world.

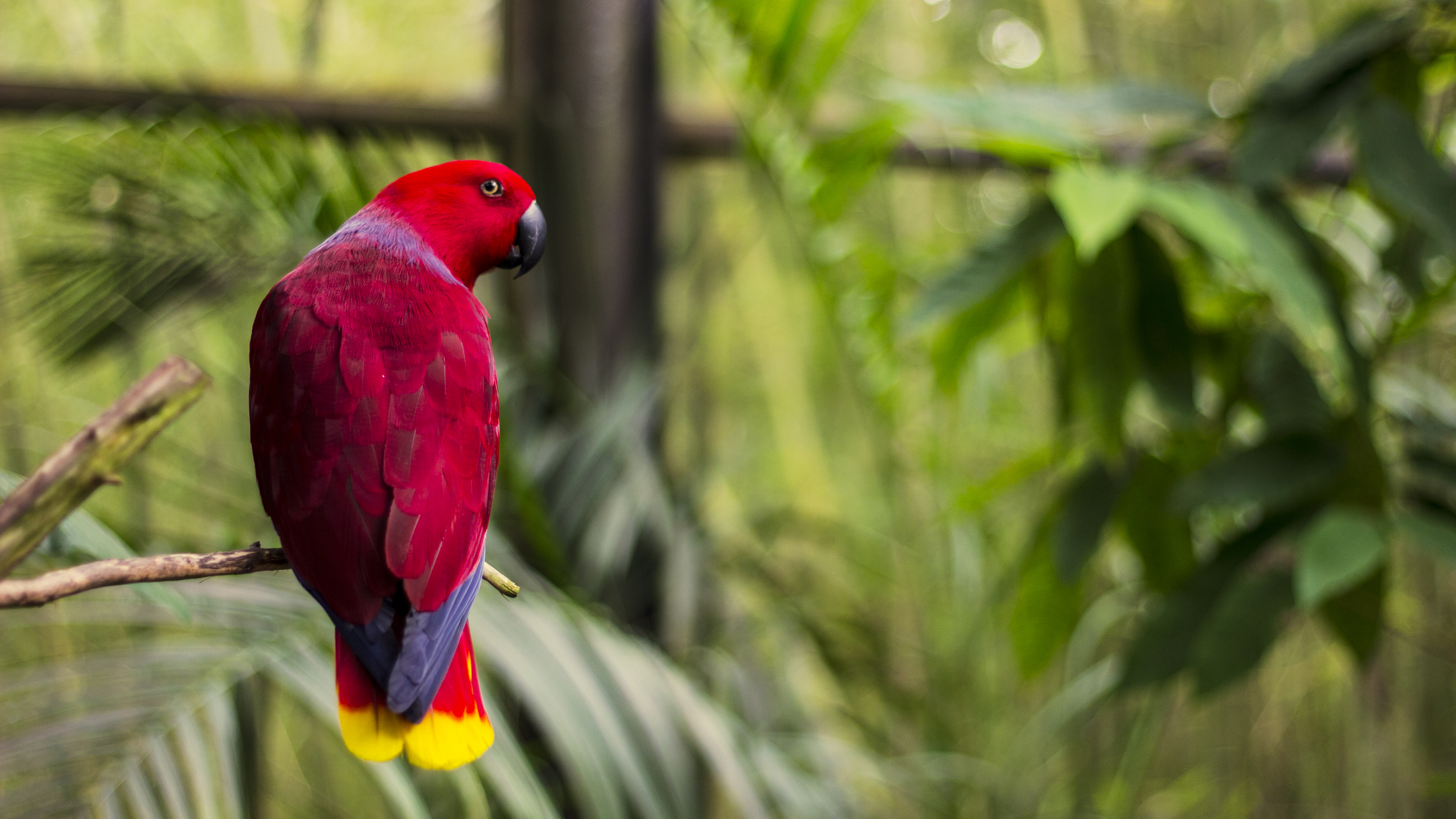
A bird in the aviary of the North Carolina Zoo.

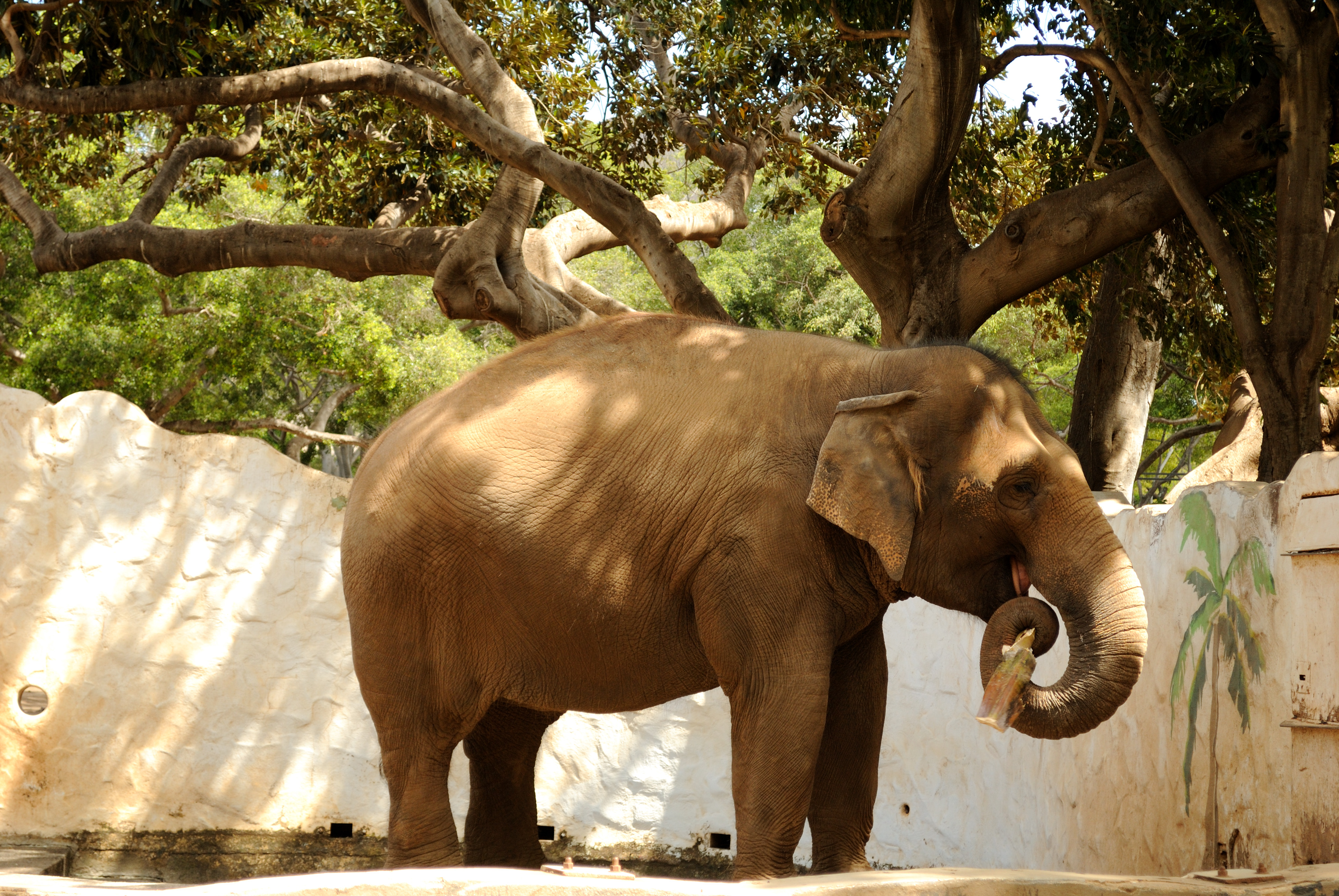
An Asian elephant at the Honolulu Zoo.

Giraffes at the Cheyenne Mountain Zoo.

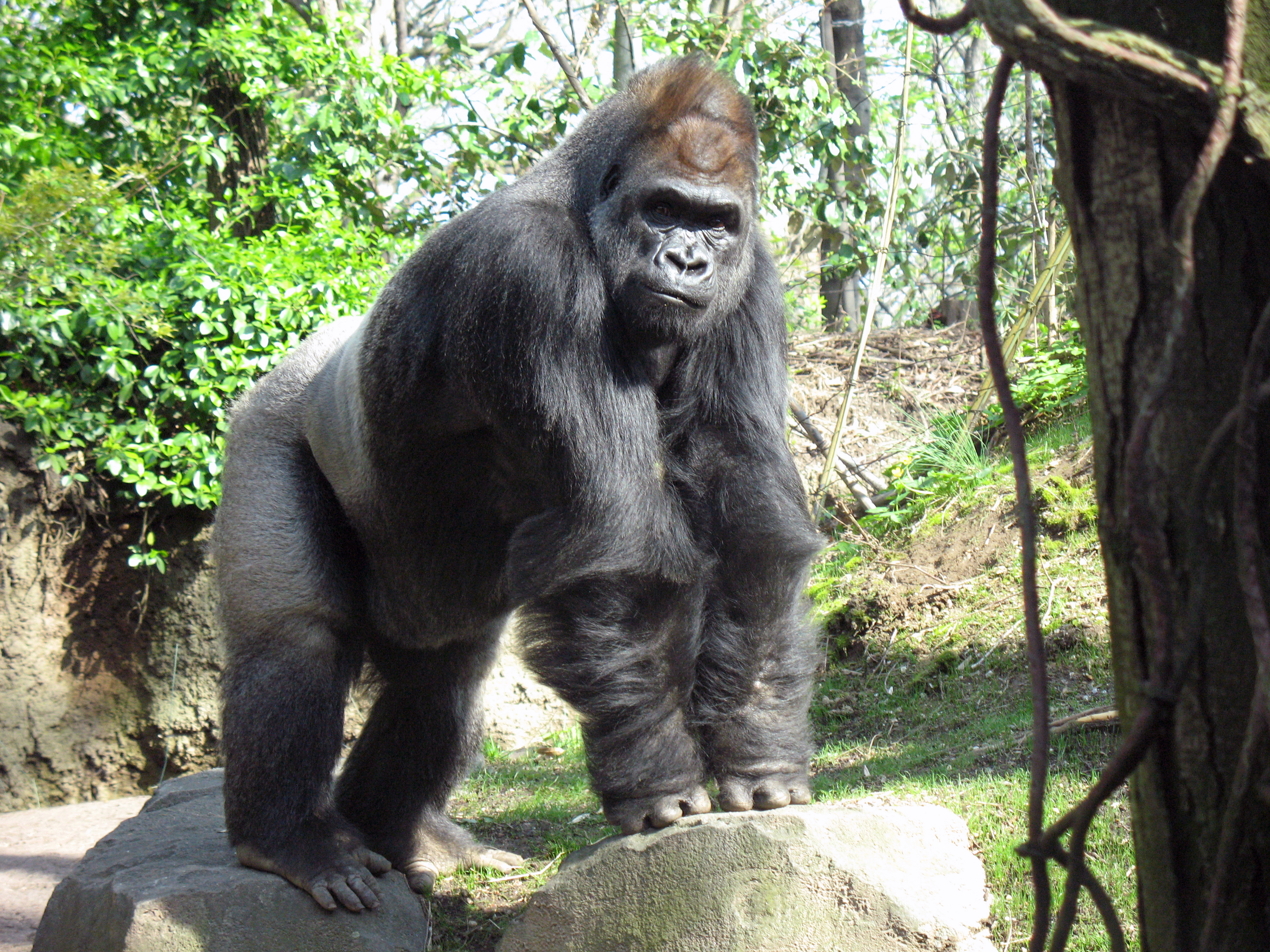
An adult male silverback gorilla at the Bronx Zoo.

=== Belize ===
- Belize Zoo

=== Bermuda ===
- Bermuda Aquarium, Museum and Zoo

=== Canada ===
- List of zoos in Canada

=== Costa Rica ===
- Africa Mia
- Arenal Eco Zoo – El Castillo, Alajuela
- Centro de Conservación de Santa Ana
- Instituto Clodomiro Picado
- Jaguar Rescue Center
- Jardin de las Mariposas
- La Paz Waterfall Gardens
- Las Pumas Cat Zoo
- Monteverde Theme Park
- Parque Viborana
- Reptilandia

=== Guatemala ===
- Auto Safari Chapin – Escuintla
- La Aurora Zoo – guatemala city

=== Mexico ===
- Africam Safari – Puebla
- Bioparque Estrella – Montemorelos, Nuevo Leon
- Bioparque Estrella – San Juan Tuxtepec, State of Mexico.
- Chapultepec Zoo – Mexico City
- El Nido – Ixtapaluca
- Guadalajara Zoo – Guadalajara, Jalisco
- Parque de Aragón Zoo – Mexico City
- Parque Loro Puebla
- Zoo León – León, Guanajuato
- Zoofari – Cuernavaca, Morelos
- Zoológico Benito Juárez – Morelia, Michoacán
- Zoológico Los Coyotes – Mexico City
- Zoológico Zacango – Toluca, México State
- ZOOMAT – Tuxtla Gutiérrez, Chiapas
- Zoológico La Pastora - Monterrey, Nuevo León

=== Panama ===
- Parque Municipal Summit – Panama City

=== United States ===
The United States has over 400 zoos. Some of the most well-known and highly rated zoos in the United States include:

- Alaska Zoo, Anchorage, Alaska
- Arizona-Sonora Desert Museum, Tucson, Arizona
- Audubon Zoo, New Orleans, Louisiana
- Blank Park Zoo, Des Moines, Iowa
- Brevard Zoo, Melbourne, Florida
- Bronx Zoo, New York City
- Brookfield Zoo Chicago, Brookfield, Illinois
- Cheyenne Mountain Zoo, Colorado Springs, Colorado
- Cincinnati Zoo and Botanical Garden, Cincinnati, Ohio
- Columbus Zoo and Aquarium, Columbus, Ohio
- Dallas Zoo, Dallas, Texas
- Denver Zoo, Denver, Colorado
- Disney's Animal Kingdom, Bay Lake, Florida
- Fort Wayne Zoo, Fort Wayne, Indiana
- Fort Worth Zoo, Fort Worth, Texas
- Houston Zoo, Houston, Texas
- Indianapolis Zoo, Indianapolis, Indiana
- Kansas City Zoo, Kansas City, Missouri
- Lincoln Park Zoo, Chicago, Illinois
- Living Desert Zoo and Gardens, Palm Desert, California
- Memphis Zoo, Memphis, Tennessee
- Minnesota Zoo, Apple Valley, Minnesota
- National Zoological Park, Washington, D.C.
- North Carolina Zoo, Asheboro, North Carolina
- Oakland Zoo, Oakland, California
- Omaha's Henry Doorly Zoo and Aquarium, Omaha, Nebraska
- Oregon Zoo, Portland, Oregon
- Philadelphia Zoo, Philadelphia, Pennsylvania
- Phoenix Zoo, Phoenix, Arizona
- Pittsburgh Zoo & Aquarium, Pittsburgh, Pennsylvania
- Roger Williams Park Zoo, Providence, Rhode Island
- Saint Louis Zoo, St. Louis, Missouri
- San Diego Zoo, San Diego, California
- San Francisco Zoo, San Francisco, California
- Sedgwick County Zoo, Wichita, Kansas
- Woodland Park Zoo, Seattle, Washington
- Zoo Atlanta, Atlanta, Georgia
- Zoo Knoxville, Knoxville, Tennessee
- Zoo Miami, Miami, Florida

== South America ==
=== Argentina ===
- Bubalcó – General Roca, Río Negro
- Temaikèn – Belén de Escobar, Buenos Aires Province
- Zoo Batán – Mar del Plata, Buenos Aires Province
- Zoo Córdoba – Córdoba, Córdoba Province
- Zoo de América – Rivadavia, Buenos Aires Province
- Zoo La Plata – La Plata, Buenos Aires Province

=== Bolivia ===
Santa Cruz Department

- Zoo Fauna Sudamericana de Santa Cruz- Santa Cruz de la Sierra

La Paz Department

- La Paz Wildlife Center - La Paz, Bolivia

=== Brazil ===
==== Acre ====
- Zoológico do Parque Chico Mendes – Rio Branco

==== Amazonas ====
- Parque Zoológico Municipal – Manaus
- Zoológico do Centro de Instrução de Guerra na Selva – Manaus

==== Bahia ====
- Parque Zoobotânico Getúlio Vargas – Salvador
- Parque Zoobotânico Rolf – Mata de São João

==== Ceará ====
- Parque Zoológico Sargento Prata – Fortaleza

==== Distrito Federal ====
- Jardim Zoológico de Brasília – Brasília

==== Goiás ====
- Parque Zoológico de Goiânia – Goiânia

==== Mato Grosso ====
- Parque Zoológico de Rondonópolis – Rondonópolis
- Zoológico da Universidade Federal de Mato Grosso – Cuiabá
- Zoológico Municipal de Alta Floresta – Alta Floresta

==== Minas Gerais ====
- Fundação Zoo-Botânica de Belo Horizonte – Belo Horizonte
- Jardim Zoológico Lauro Palhares – Pará de Minas
- Parque Zoobotânico de Pouso Alegre – Pouso Alegre
- Parque Zoobotânico Doutor Mário Frota – Varginha
- Zoológico Municipal Amaro Sátiro de Araújo – Montes Claros
- Zoológico Municipal de Sete Lagoas – Sete Lagoas
- Zoológico Municipal de Três Pontas – Três Pontas
- Zoológico Municipal Parque do Sabiá – Uberlândia
- Zoológico Municipal Parque dos Jacarandás – Uberaba

==== Pará ====
- Parque Zoobotânico de Carajás – Parauapebas
- Parque Zoobotânico do Museu Paraense Emílio Goeldi – Belém

==== Paraná ====
- Parque das Aves – Foz do Iguaçu
- Parque Ecológico Municipal Danilo Galafassi – Cascavel
- Zoológico Bosque Guarani – Foz do Iguaçu
- Zoológico de Matelândia – Matelândia
- Zoológico Municipal de Curitiba – Curitiba

==== Paraíba ====
- Parque Zoológico Arruda Câmara – João Pessoa

==== Pernambuco ====
- Parque Zoológico Municipal Antônio Melo Verçosa – Vitória de Santo Antão
- Zoo Botanical Park Dois Irmaos – Recife

==== Piauí ====
- Parque Zoobotânico – Teresina

==== Rio de Janeiro ====
- Jardim Zoológico de Niterói – Niterói
- Rio de Janeiro Zoo – Rio de Janeiro
- Zoológico Municipal de Volta Redonda – Volta Redonda
- Zoológico Municipal de Barra do Piraí – Barra do Piraí

==== Rio Grande do Sul ====
- Gramado Zoo – Gramado
- Pampas Safari – Gravataí
- Parque Zoológico – Sapucaia do Sul
- Zoológico do Litoral – Osório
- Zoológico Municipal de Cachoeira do Sul – Cachoeira do Sul
- Zoológico Municipal de Canoas – Canoas

==== Rondônia ====
- Zoológico de Vilhena – Vilhena

==== Roraima ====
- Zoológico do Sétimo Batalhão de Infantaria de Selva – Boa Vista

==== Santa Catarina ====
- Parque Cyro Gevaerd Santur – Balneário Camboriú
- Parque Ecológico e Zoobotânico de Brusque – Brusque
- Parque Zoobotânico de Joinville – Joinville
- Zoológico Pomerode – Pomerode

==== São Paulo ====
- Jardim Zoobotânico de Franca – Franca
- Municipal Zoological Park Quinzinho de Barros – Sorocaba
- Parque Ecológico "Dr. Antônio T. Viana" – São Carlos
- Parque Ecológico Municipal "Cid Almeida Franco" – Americana
- Parque Zoológico de Ilha Solteira – Ilha Solteira
- Parque Zoológico Dr. Fábio de Sá Barreto – Ribeirão Preto
- Parque Zoológico Eugênio Walter – Boituva
- Parque Zoológico Municipal de Guarulhos (Guarulhos)
- São Paulo Zoo – São Paulo
- Zoológico de Jardinópolis – Jardinópolis
- Zoológico Municipal de Araçatuba "Dr. Flávio Leite Ribeiro" – Araçatuba
- Zoológico Municipal de Bauru – Bauru
- Zoológico Municipal de Buri – Buri
- Zoológico Municipal de Campinas – Campinas
- Zoológico Municipal de Catanduva – Catanduva
- Zoológico Municipal de Garça "Dr. Belírio Guimarães Brandão" – Garça
- Zoológico Municipal de Leme – Leme
- Zoológico Municipal de Limeira – Limeira
- Zoológico Municipal de Lins – Lins
- Zoológico Municipal de Mogi Guaçu – Mogi Guaçu
- Zoológico Municipal de Mogi Mirim "Luiz Gonzaga Amoêdo Campos" – Mogi-Mirim
- Zoológico Municipal de Pedreira – Pedreira
- Zoológico Municipal de Piracicaba – Piracicaba
- Zoológico Municipal de Santa Bárbara d'Oeste – Santa Bárbara d'Oeste
- Zoológico Municipal de São Bernardo do Campo – São Bernardo do Campo
- Zoológico Municipal de São José do Rio Preto – São José do Rio Preto
- Zoológico Municipal de São Vicente – São Vicente
- Zoológico Municipal de Taboão da Serra – Taboão da Serra
- Zoológico Municipal Henrique Pedroni – Sumaré
- Zoológico Municipal Nestor Bologna – Vargem Grande do Sul
- Zoológico Vale dos Bichos – São José dos Campos
- Zooparque Itatiba – Itatiba

==== Sergipe ====
- Boa Luz Eco Parque – Laranjeiras
- Parque Zoológico – Aracaju

=== Chile ===
- Buin Zoo – Buin
- Chilean National Zoo – Santiago
- Concepción Zoo – Concepción
- La Serena Zoo – La Serena
- Parque safari de Rancagua – Rancagua
- Quilpue Zoo – Quilpué

=== Colombia ===
- Barranquilla Zoo – Barranquilla
- Bioparque Los Ocarros – Villavicencio
- Cali Zoo – Cali
- Hacienda Nápoles – Medellín
- Jaime Duque Park Zoo – Bogotá
- Santa Fe Zoo – Medellín
- Santacruz Zoo – San Antonio del Tequendama

=== Ecuador ===
- Bioparque Amaru – Cuenca
- Guayabamba Zoo – Quito
- Parque Condor – Otavalo

=== French Guiana ===
- French Guiana Zoo – Montsinéry

=== Guyana ===
- Guyana Zoo

=== Paraguay ===
- Botanical Garden and Zoo of Asunción – Asunción

=== Peru ===
- Parque de las Leyendas, San Miguel, Lima
- Parque Zoológico de Huachipa – Ate, Lima
- Zoocriadero – Lima
- Zoológico de Quistococha – Iquitos, Loreto

=== Suriname ===
- Paramaribo Zoo – Paramaribo

=== Uruguay ===
- Parque Lecocq – Montevideo
- Zoológico Municipal Villa Dolores – Montevideo

=== Venezuela ===
- Bararida Zoo
