= Ogba Zoo =

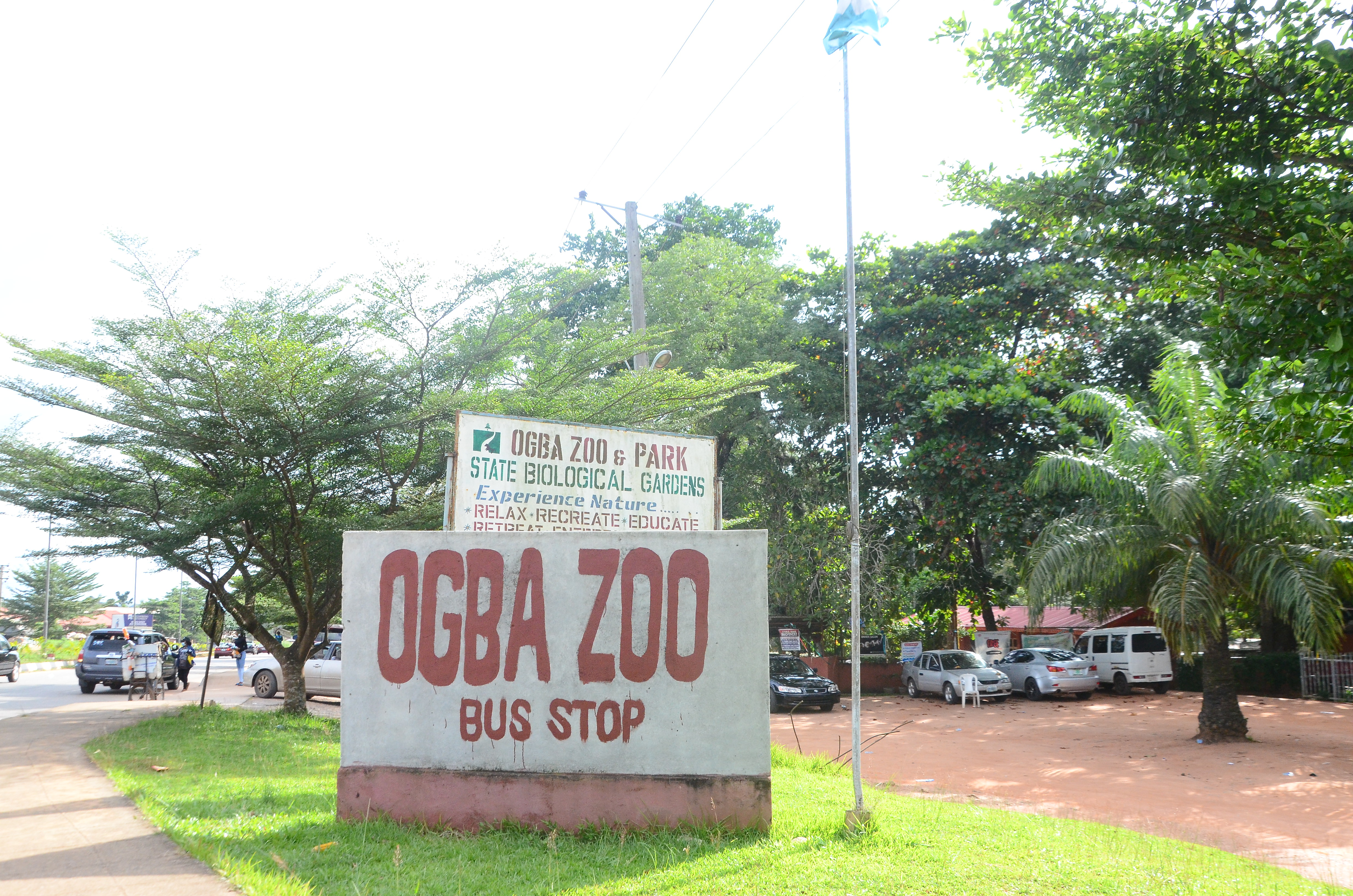
- Ogba Zoo Sign Post
- Interactive map of Ogba Zoo
- 6°17′20″N 5°35′16″E
- Date opened: 1965
- Location: Benin City, Nigeria
- Land area: 300 hectares (750 acres)
- Owner: State owned
- Website: http://www.ogbazoo.com/

Ogba Zoo (also known as Ogba Zoo & Nature Park) is a state-owned zoological park located in Oko Central, Oredo Local Government Area in Benin City, of Edo State, Nigeria.

The nature park was established in 1971 in a forest reserve in the Ogba District, four kilometers from the town center.

The area covers 300 hectares (750 acres) of land and water, and is home to local and other wild species, including primates, lions, giant tortoises, rock pythons, equine and antelope species.

Information and Culture Minister Lai Mohammed described the zoo as one of Nigeria's top tourist destinations.

== Incidents ==
On September 25, 2017, the zoo was attacked by gunmen who killed three policemen and abducted the zoo's director, Andy Ehanire.

Beyond the attack incident, the zoo has moved to strengthen its security architecture through collaboration with relevant security outfits and agencies.

== See also ==
- List of zoos
