= Shymkent Zoo =

Шымкент хайуанханасы Shymkent Zoo
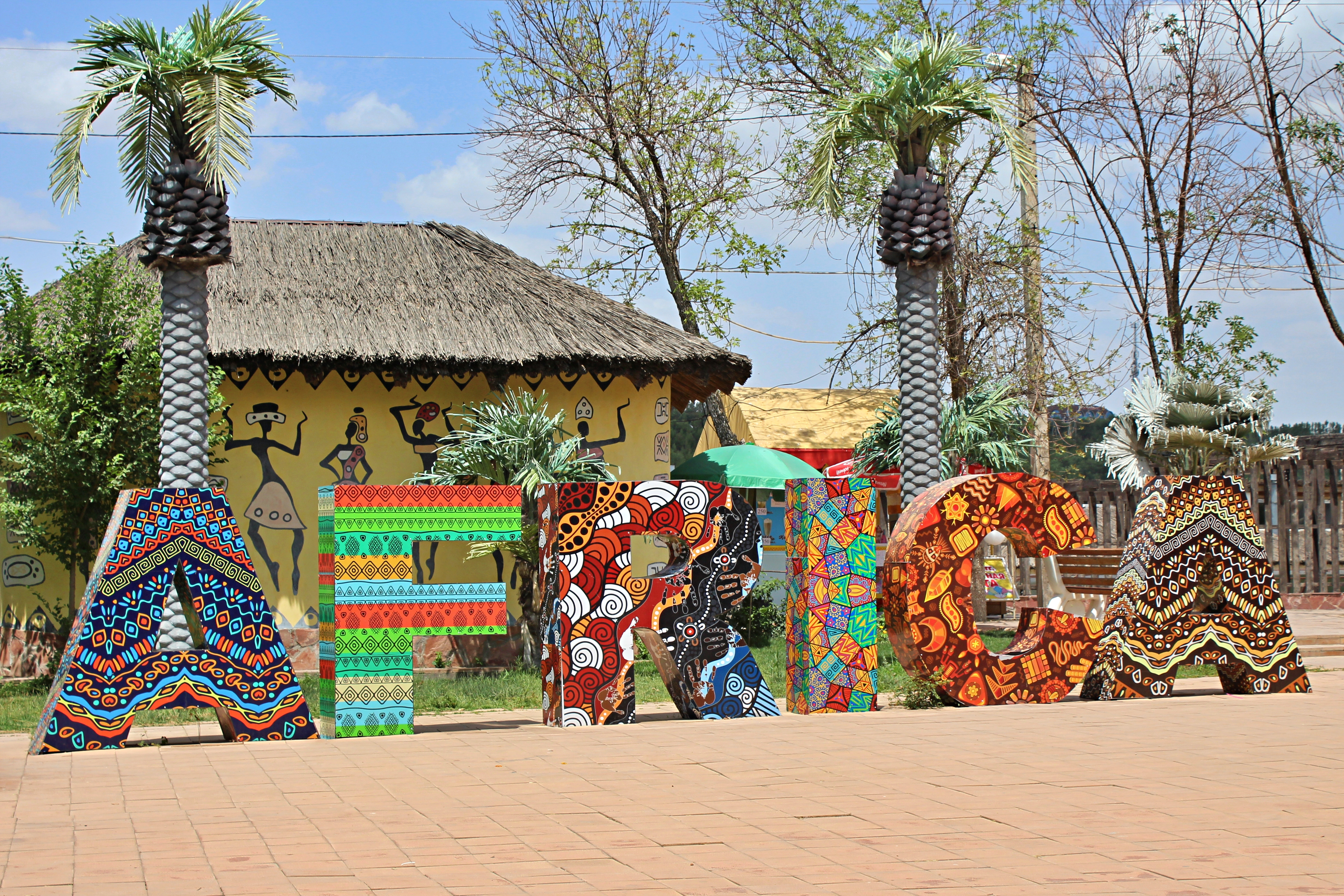
- Africa section of the Shymkent Zoo
- Interactive map of Шымкент хайуанханасы Shymkent Zoo
- 42.376971°N 69.628091°E
- Date opened: 1980
- Location: Shymkent, Kazakhstan
- Land area: 54 hectares (130 acres)
- No. of animals: Более 1600 (2012)
- No. of species: 185 (2013)
- Website: https://shymkentzoo.kz/ru/

The Shymkent Zoo (Kazakh: Шымкент хайуанханасы, romanized: Şymkent haiuanhanasy; Russian: Шымкентский зоопарк) is the state zoo of the city Shymkent in Kazakhstan. It is one of the largest and oldest zoological parks in the country. From the total zoo's area of 54 hectares (130 acres), under an exposition 34 hectares (84 acres). The Shymkent Zoo contains more than 20 kinds of animals brought in the 'Red book'. 25% of requirements of forages for animals the zoo grow up on own earth, the area of 30 hectares (74 acres).

== See also ==
- List of zoos
- Almaty Zoo
- Karaganda Zoo
