= Pleven Zoo =

- Interactive map of Pleven Zoo
- 43.3555156°N 24.6431065°E
- Location: Pleven, Bulgaria
- No. of animals: 130
- No. of species: 27

Pleven Zoo is a zoo located in Kaylaka Park in Pleven, a city in Bulgaria.

The zoo is known for its brown bears, and some of the Zoos bears were adopted from the forest.
