= Zhoukou Safari Park =

Zoo in Zhoukou

Zhoukou Safari Park is a zoo in Zhoukou, Henan. There are more than 200 species and more than 10,000 animals at the zoo. The zoo has a total area of close to 2000 acres. Construction started on March 31, 2019, with a total investment of 2.24 billion yuan.
