= Dierenpark de Oliemeulen =

Dierenpark De Oliemeulen
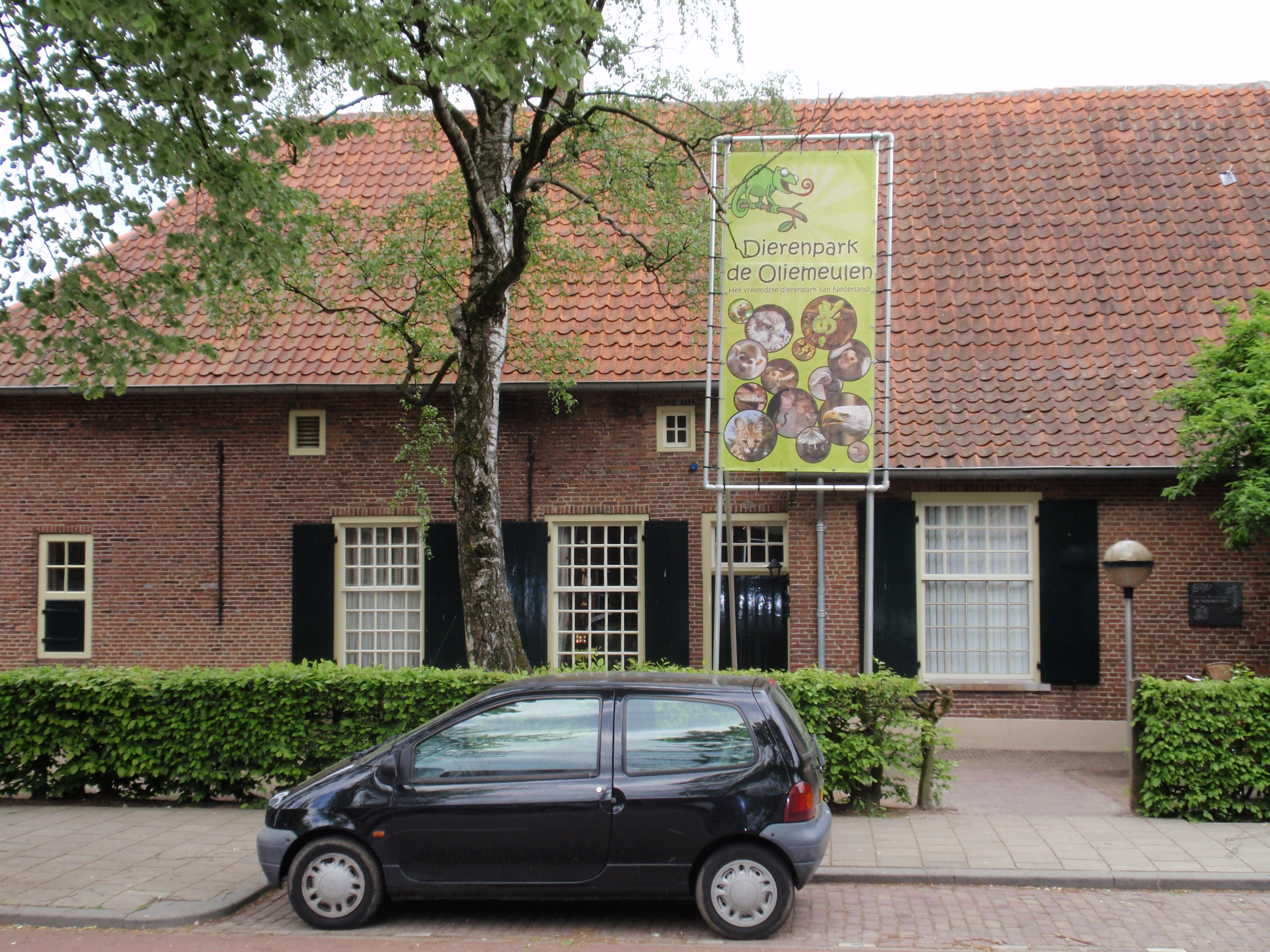
- The Oliemeulen zoo
- Interactive map of Dierenpark De Oliemeulen
- 51.5708549°N 5.062058°E
- Date opened: 1987
- Location: Tilburg, Netherlands
- Annual visitors: 45,0000 (2003)
- Website: www.oliemeulen.nl

Dierenpark De Oliemeulen (Zoo The Oliemeulen) is a small zoo in Tilburg, Netherlands that describes itself as "the strangest zoo in the Netherlands".

The zoo opened in an old farmhouse in 1987. It was initially just a reptile house, but was expanded in 1992 to include mammals such as monkeys and raccoons, and birds including parrots and birds of prey.
