= Grodno Zoo =

Zoo in Belarus

Coordinates: 53°41′22″N 23°50′55″E

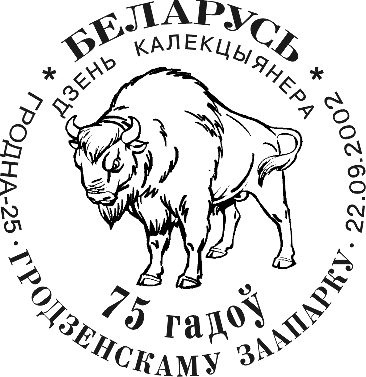
- Logo dedicated to the 75th anniversary of the founding of the Grodno Zoo
- Interactive map of Grodno Zoo
- Date opened: 1927
- Land area: 5.35 hectares
- No. of animals: 3 000
- No. of species: 317
- Memberships: EARAZA
- Website: http://www.grodnozoo.by

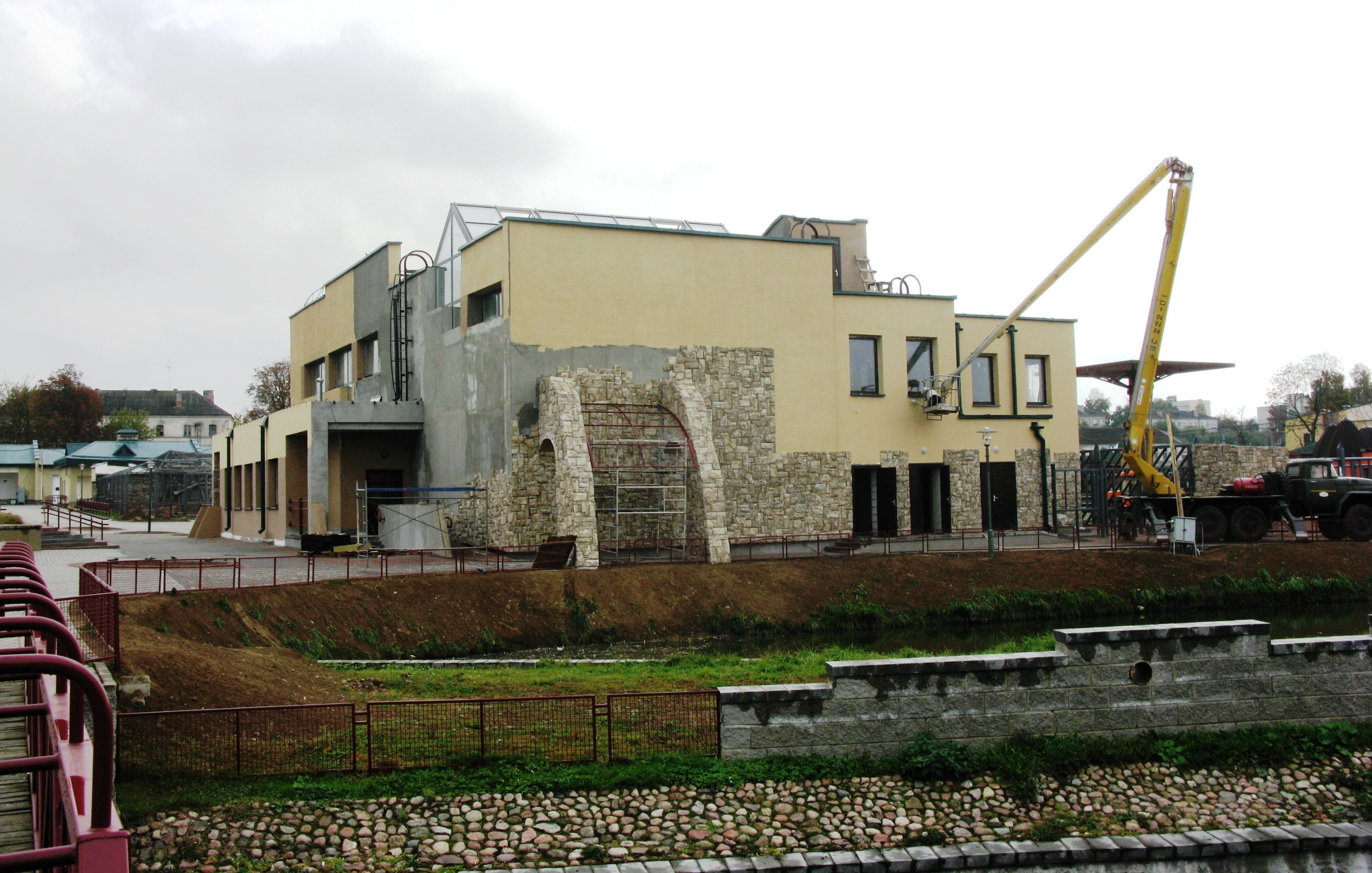
Construction of the new elephant enclosure in Grodno Zoo 2011

Grodno Zoo is a zoo located in Grodno in Belarus.

Grodno Zoo was founded in 1927 as the first zoo in future Belarus on the initiative of the high school teacher Jan Kochanowski. In 1926 Kochanowski, together with his pupils, established a botanical garden in the city park, which in 1927 received the first animals. The new zoological department had 17 species of local fauna. Nine years later in 1936, Grodno zoo had about 400 exhibits,

The Second World War more or less destroyed the zoo, and not much was left in 1944. On 12 December 1944 the Executive Committee of Grodno decided to restore the zoo. The zoo opened its gate again on 28 September 1946.

The first Asian elephant arrived on 30 August 1955 from Vietnam.

Grodno Zoo became a member of EARAZA in 2009.

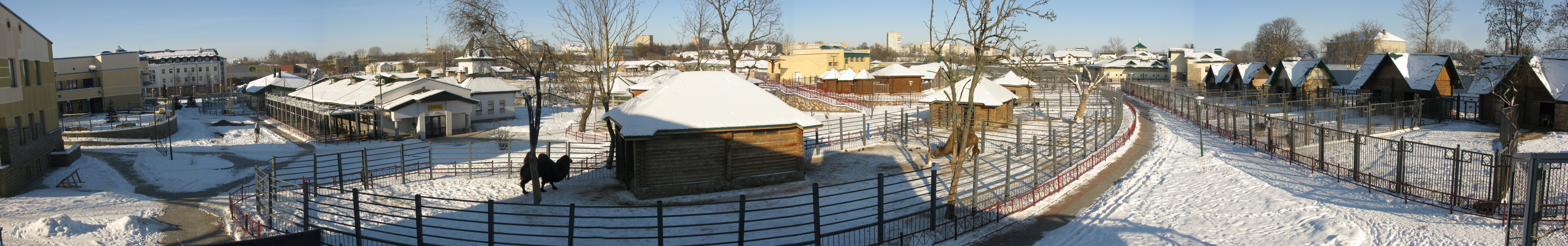
A winter panorama from Grodno Zoo in 2012

== Jan Kochanowski ==
The founder of Grodno Zoo, Jan Kochanowski, was born in 1894 in the city of Grodno. In 1942, local Polish resistance fighters were arrested by the Gestapo for the alleged murder of a German doctor and imprisoned along with other representatives of the intelligentsia of Grodno. When the city turned to the occupation authorities for the release of hostages, the Gestapo chief agreed not to shoot all of the captives. Among the captives to be shot was one Kochanowski teacher Józef Wiewiórski - the father of five or six children. The remaining hostages, including Jan Kochanowski, were to be set free, but Kochanowski appealed to the German officer to include him among those sentenced to death instead of Józef Wiewiórski, since he did not have a family. In the autumn of 1942 Jan Kochanowski was shot dead. Wiewiórski was executed in 1943 together with his family.
