= Yancheng Wild Animal World =

- Interactive map of Yancheng Wild Animal World
- 31°42′01″N 119°55′16″E
- Date opened: October 1, 2007
- Location: Changzhou Wujin city center, Jiangsu, China
- Land area: 2,000 acres (810 ha)

Yancheng Wild Animal World is located in the Yangtze River golden triangle area of the Changzhou Wujin city center in Jiangsu, China. The zoo is only open during the spring and autumn.

Located seven kilometers south of Changzhou, the Yancheng Wild Zoo is located within the ruins of an ancient town, 0.6 square kilometers in area, whose history can be traced back to the Western Zhou dynasty and the Spring and Autumn period, approximately 3,000 years ago. A variety of artifacts have been discovered within the excavation site, including china and bronzes. The most historically significant items recovered are four open wooden canoes that are 11 meters in length, 1 meter in width, and 0.5 meters in depth; they are currently exhibited in the Beijing Museum. Discoveries from the Yancheng site are dated from the Spring and Autumn period.

Yancheng Site measures 850 meters long from east to west and 750 meters wide from south to north, with a total area of 650,000 square meters. The site is divided by three moats into several areas, called core city, core city moat, inner city, inner city moat, outer city and outer city moat, respectively.

Jiangsu Yancheng Wild Animal World is known as a free-roaming zoo. It is a fairly large theme park, consisting of animals, entertainment, general popular science appreciation, and cultural displays. The 2,000 acre zoo is an investment of about 500 million yuan. It officially opened to the public on October 1 2007. On display are rare and endangered wild animals from across the world. Currently, Yancheng Wild Zoo is the only large scale wild zoo in Jiangsu province.

Yancheng Wild Zoo has the only drive tour scenic spot in Jiangsu province. Animals on display at the zoo include swans, argali, deer, elk, camels and lions.

In the walking area is a swan lake, a peacock garden, Australian-styled fields, primates, and an "ape island". In the driving area, visitors can hire special bikes to watch animals in different areas, such as bears, tigers, wolves and cheetahs. The performance area encompasses the Ocean Theatre, where performances are staged. The service area contains a restaurant, a food plaza, shops and places of leisure.

== Allegations of animal cruelty ==
Yancheng Wild Animal World has a long history of animal abuse and cruelty, mainly involving poor living conditions for the animals and the feeding of live animals to predators. In 2017, angry shareholders wanted to remove the animals from the zoo and sell them, but were stopped. As an act of revenge, they decided to throw a live donkey into the tigers' enclosure in front of an audience, and the entire ordeal was filmed. The donkey was mauled by the tigers and died half an hour later. The shareholders planned on throwing other animals into the tigers' enclosure as well, but were prevented from doing so. Since there are no laws in China to prevent animal cruelty, nothing was done about the incident.
