= Stara Zagora Zoo =

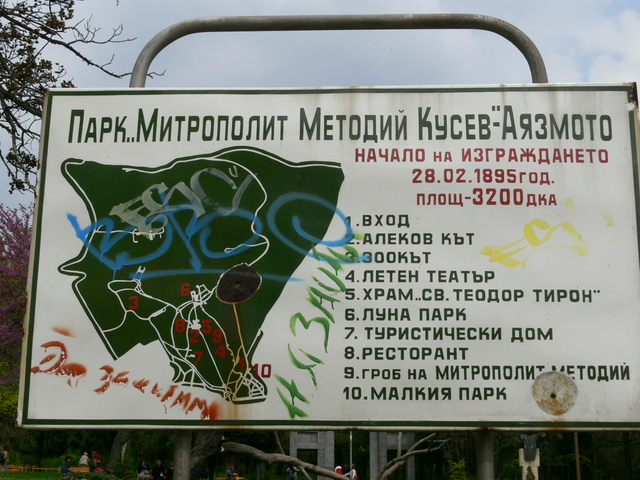
- Interactive map of Stara Zagora Zoo
- 42.4382727°N 25.6095761°E
- Date opened: April 26, 1957
- Location: Stara Zagora, Bulgaria
- Land area: 70 acres
- No. of animals: 450
- No. of species: 40
- Director: Dr. Nayden Ilinov
- Management: Stara Zagora municipality
- Website: https://zoo.starazagora.bg

Stara Zagora Zoo is a zoo located in Ayazmoto Park in Stara Zagora, Bulgaria.

Zoo Stara Zagora was established on April 26, 1957, and is situated in area in the park called "Holy Spring". It occupies an area of 70 acres.

== History ==
The Zoo got its start in 1956, when a labor division from the city caught a fallow deer, which had escaped from Ormana, a forested area near Yambol. The division subsequently donated the deer to the then department of Gardens and Parks, after which the City's People's Council made the decision to begin the creation of the zoo.

After that, on March 24, 1957, a pair of baby bears were captured by two hunters in the Shipchenska Mountain and donated. They are often cited as being the first animals in the zoo.

The Stara Zagora zoo was formally established the next month, on April 26, 1957, becoming the second zoological garden in the country, after the Sofia Zoo.

The initial enclosure from the 1950s, which was a fenced area of about 4 hectares, was located about half a kilometer to the east of the current zoo, where currently there are several badminton courts.

The current, much larger zoological garden, was devised and agreed upon by the municipality on 13 June, 1961. However, construction efforts did not start until 1965. During the late 60s and 70s, habitats for bears, lions, monkeys and other animals were constructed. By 1978, the infrastructure needed by the zoo was largely in place.
