= Escurial Zoo and Flower Park =

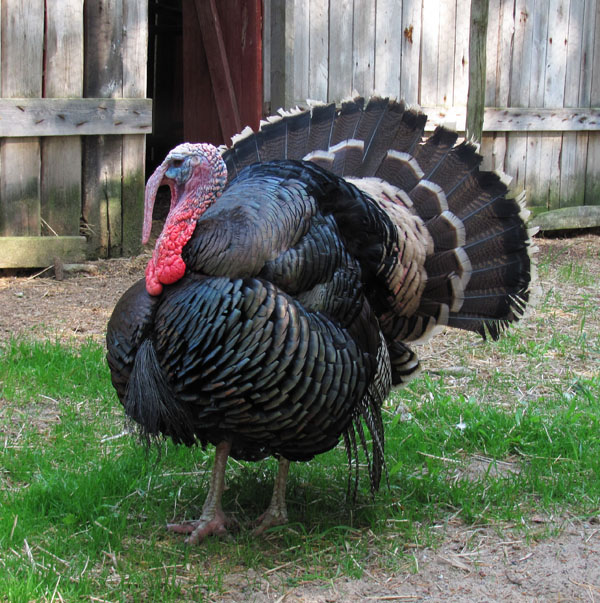
- A wild turkey at Escurial.
- Interactive map of Escurial Zoo and Flower Park
- 64°43′14.6″N 025°23′20.3″E
- Date opened: 1987
- Location: Liminka, Finland
- No. of animals: 400
- No. of species: 50
- Website: www.kukka-jaelainpuistoescurial.fi/escurial-in-english/

Escurial Zoo and Flower Park, previously called the Liminka zoo is a zoo located in Liminka, North Ostrobothnia, Finland approximately 40 km from the regional capital of Oulu.

Escurial was established in 1987 and was based in Tyrnävä before moving to its current location in 1995. The Zoo and Flower Park is home to nearly 400 animals including pigs, horses, donkeys, llamas, alpacas, reindeer and multiple species of birds. The park has a cafe, multiple outdoor grill areas and a garden market where flowers are sold. It also has accommodation available through reservation.
