= Dar es Salaam Zoo =

Coordinates: 6.943941°S 39.401370°E

- Interactive map of Dar es Salaam Zoo
- Location: Kigamboni, Tanzania
- Website: www.daressalaamzoo.com

Dar es Salaam Zoo (Swahili: Bustani ya wanyama ya Dar es Salaam) is a zoological park in Dar es Salaam, Tanzania. The zoo is located in the Kigamboni-district in the eastern part of the city, 37 km (23 mi) from Downtown Dar es Salaam.

== Attractions ==
The Dar es Salaam Zoo is best known for having many animals endemic to Tanzania, including but not limited to zebras, crocodiles, antelopes, tortoises, gazelles, monkeys, hyenas, lions, leopards, snakes, and several species of birds. There is also a kids' zone with slides, swings and jungle-gyms. The Dar es salaam Zoo also has a swimming pool for children and teenagers under 13. Dar es salaam Zoo gives an opportunity to foreigners and locals to get close to animals and interact with some animals such as monkeys, horses, donkeys and camels, also providing a dream ride for the visitors. Nguva river is also one of the biggest attraction of Dar es salaam Zoo, providing water and cool climate for the natural vegetation attracting different species of colourful and uniquely attractive birds, butterflies and other natures beauty creations. It is one of the largest zoo's in East Africa hence providing its singular taste for both locals and foreigners.
