= Zoológico Los Coyotes =

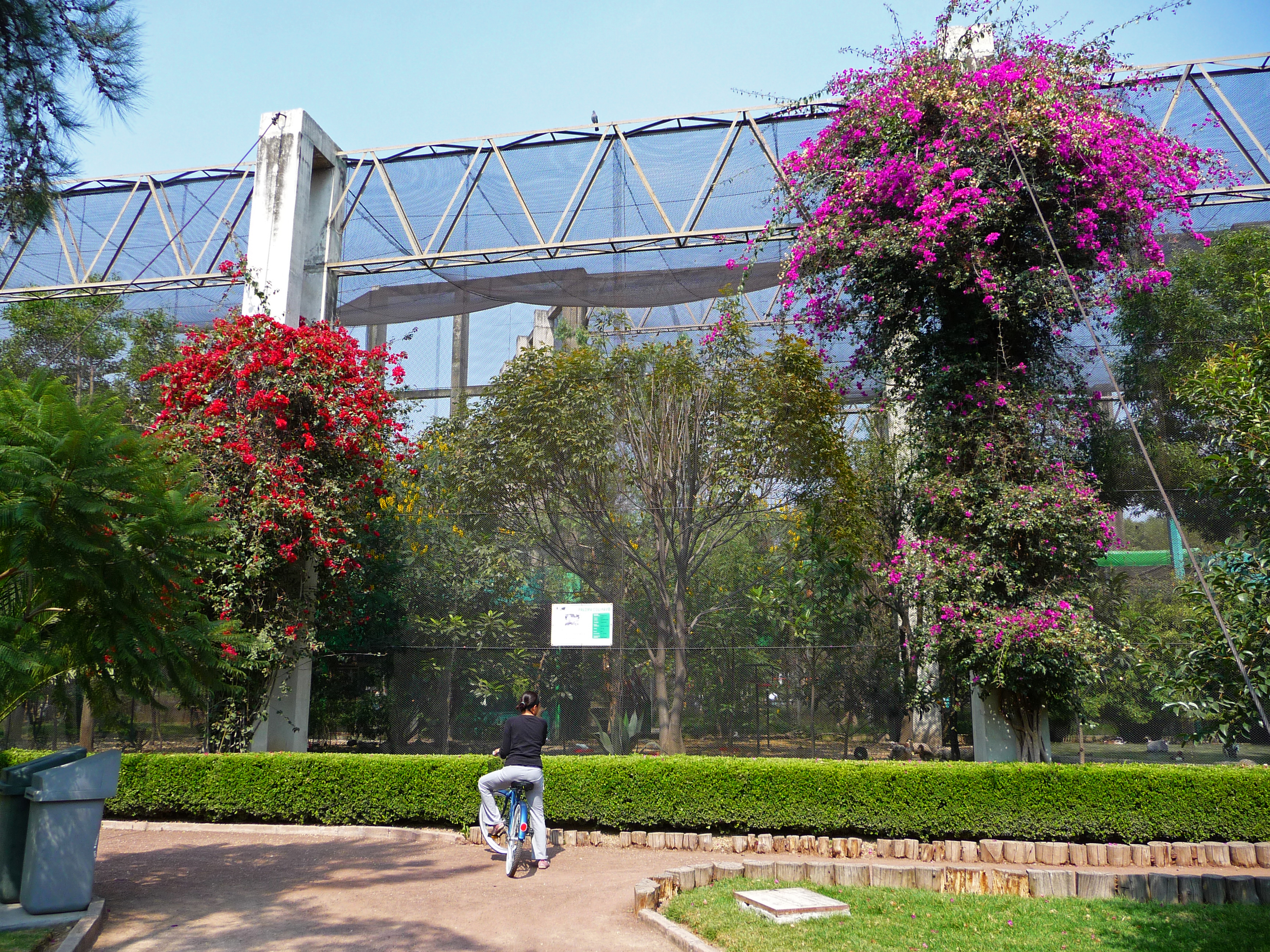
- The aviary
- Interactive map of Zoológico Los Coyotes
- 19.319°N 99.122°W
- Date opened: 2 February 1999
- Location: Mexico City, Mexico
- Website: www.loscoyotes.df.gob.mx

The Zoológico Los Coyotes is the third zoo in Mexico City, Mexico. It was opened on 2 February 1999 to complement the other zoos of the City of Mexico. It is built on a site that was previously a centre for seized animals, which it fell into disrepair. It mainly exhibits endemic and native fauna of Mexico including two coyotes, the species that the zoo is named after.
