= Junsele Djurpark =

Coordinates: 63°41′52.38″N 16°51′31.83″E

Junsele djurpark
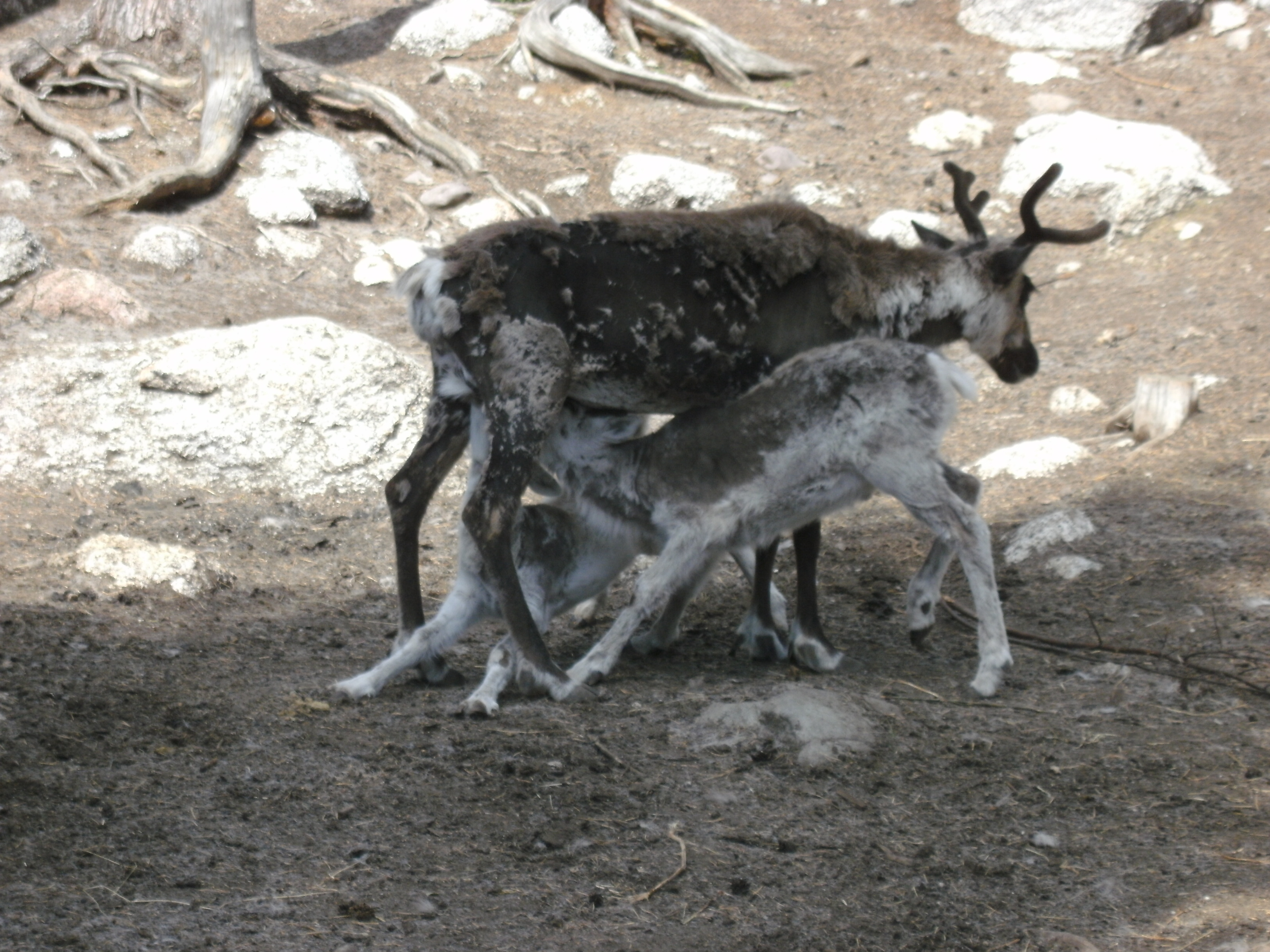
- Reindeer in Junsele djurpark
- Interactive map of Junsele djurpark
- Date opened: 1965
- Location: Junsele, Sollefteå kommun
- No. of species: 25
- Owner: Äventyrsberget
- Website: http://www.aventyrsberget.se

Junsele djurpark is a Swedish zoo in Junsele, Sollefteå kommun, in Sweden.

The zoo was founded and opened in 1965. Junsele kommun bought the zoo in 1969, and sold it in 1992 to the Äventyrsberget company.
