= Grönåsen Älg- och Lantdjurspark =

Coordinates: 56°49′56″N 15°24′20″E

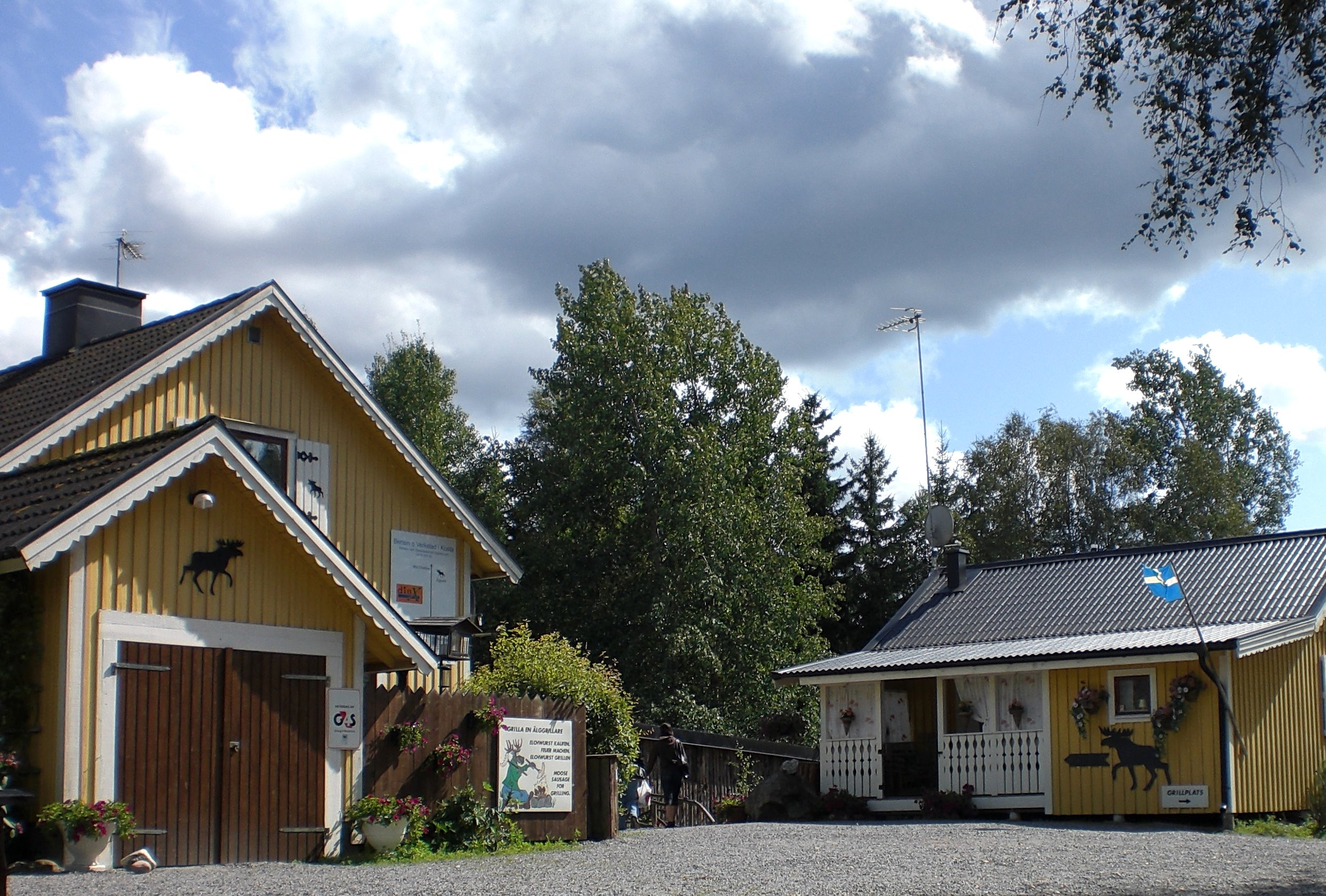
- Entrance
- Interactive map of Grönåsen Älg- och Lantdjurspark
- Date opened: 1994
- Location: Grönåsen 2, 360 52 Kosta
- No. of species: 5
- Owner: Inger Axelsson
- Website: http://www.gronasen.se/

The Moose Gustav

Grönåsen Älg- och Lantdjurspark ("Grönåsen Elk and Farm animal Park") is a Swedish zoo located in Kosta in Kronoberg County, Sweden, specialized in moose and display the rare white colored moose.
