= Tarsus Zoo =

Zoo in Tarsus ilçe, Mersin Province, Turkey

Coordinates: 36°58′N 34°54′E

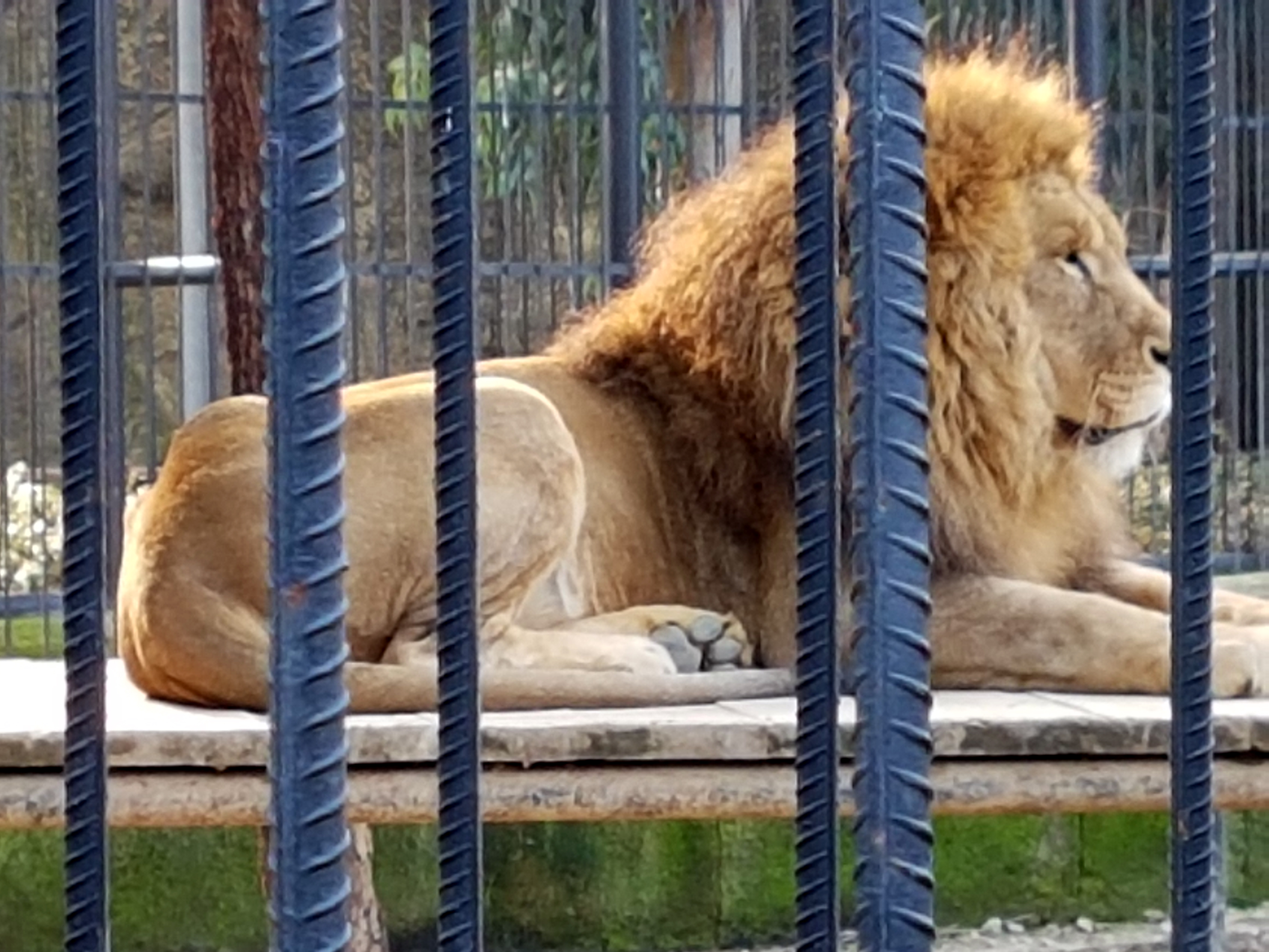
A male lion in Tarsus zoo

Tarsus Zoo (Tarsus Hayvanat Bahçesi) is a zoo in Tarsus ilçe (district) of Mersin Province, Turkey. Its area is 110 decares (0.11 km^{2}; 0.042 sq mi).

== Location ==
In 1999 a small zoo in midtown Tarsus with only a few small animals was established by the municipality of Tarsus. But its area was small and Haytap, the animal-rights-activists forced the municipality to move the zoo to a more convenient area. According to Haytap the former zoo was an animal prison rather than a zoo. The current zoo was opened on 27 December 2013. It is in the northern part of the urban fabric. It is to the south of Berdan Dam reservoir and the picnic area. Its gate is located under the viaduct of Turkish motorway O.53. Its distance to Mersin is about 30 kilometres (19 mi).T

== Species ==
There are currently 81 species, zebra being the last to enter the zoo. According to an announcement an elephant and a giraffe will soon arrive in the zoo.

== Admission fee ==
The zoo is open from 9 AM to 5 PM (6 PM in summers) The admission fee is TL 8.
