= Bioparco di Sicilia =

- Interactive map of Bioparco di Sicilia
- Type: Zoo, prehistoric park
- Location: Carini, Italy
- Area: 60,000 m^{2} (650,000 sq ft)
- Created: 1999 as a prehistoric park 2002 as a zoological garden
- Status: Open all year

Bioparco di Sicilia is a zoological garden established in Carini, Sicily, Italy in 1999 as a prehistoric park, over an area of 60,000 square meters.

== History ==
The park was inaugurated in 1999 with life-size reproductions of 20 dinosaurs. In 2001, the aquarium was built, featuring freshwater and saltwater fish, and the entertainment areas for the park's young visitors were expanded. In 2002, the program for the creation of the zoological garden began with the introduction of numerous animal species from different continents. Among them: Nile lechwe, various red deer, capybaras, a rhea, cotton-top tamarins, a pygmy hippopotamus, a Nile crocodile, a Barbary macaque, Grant's zebras, etc.
