= Auto Safari Chapin =

Guatemalan animal park and preserve

Auto Safari Chapín
- Logo of Auto Safari Chapin
- Interactive map of Auto Safari Chapín
- 14.1013°N 90.6265°W
- Date opened: 1980
- Location: Escuintla, Guatemala
- Website: www.autosafarichapin.com

Auto Safari Chapín is an animal park near Escuintla, Guatemala. The park features several areas including:

- Drive-through animal preserve with areas for lions, giraffes, hippopotamus and other species
- Walk-through zoo (near the entrance to the recreation area)
- Recreation area with a restaurant, lagoon boat rides and a swimming pool

It is open Tuesday through Sunday, from 9:30 am to 5 pm. The restaurant is open from 10:30 am to 5 pm. There is a snack bar midway through the drive-through with drinks and a small selection of snacks.

The park was founded in 1980 as a natural reserve area and is the largest animal parks/zoos in Guatemala. It lies on the 87.5 km at the CA-2 highway, between Escuintla and Taxisco.
