= Bitola Zoo =

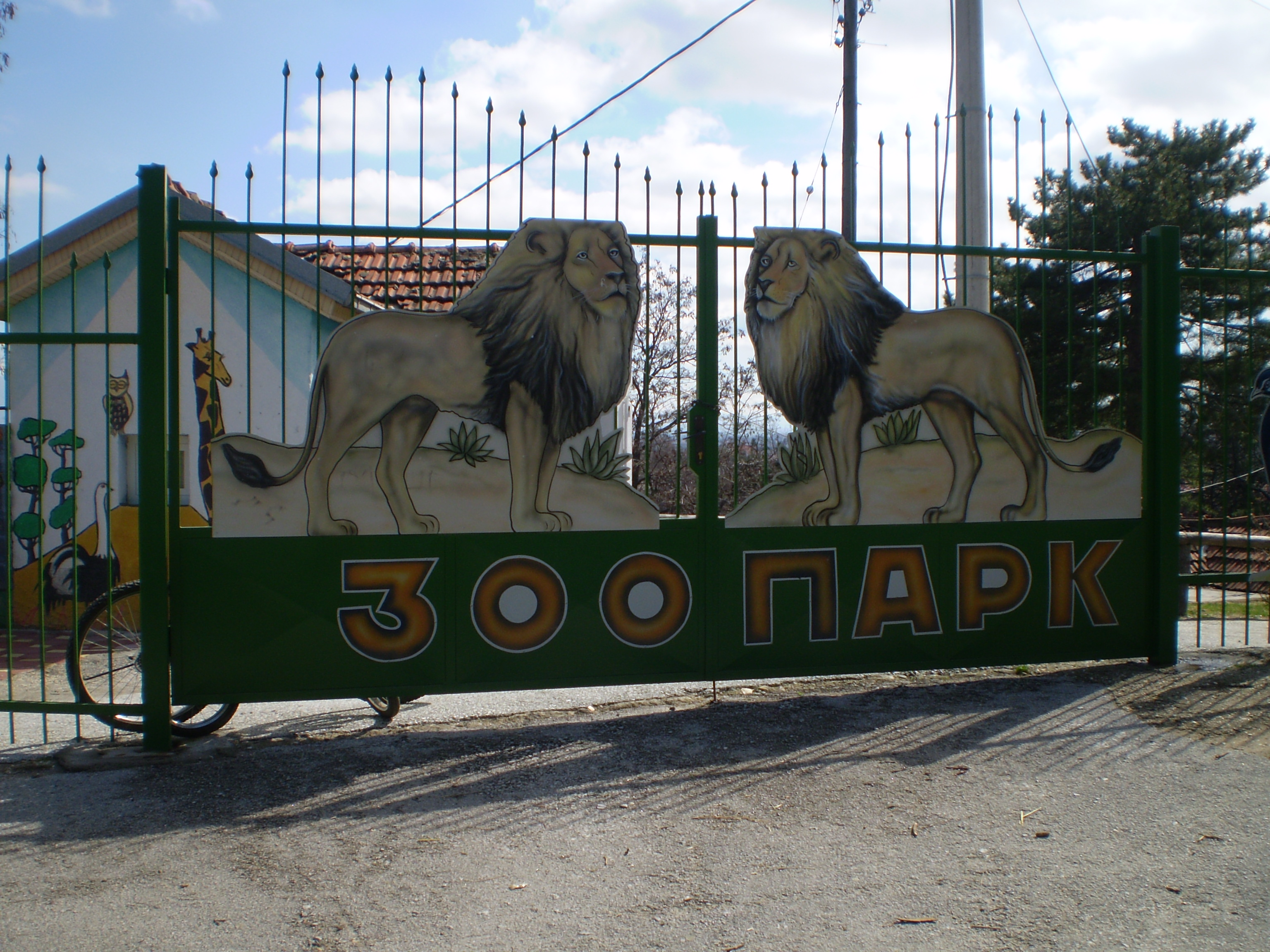
- Zoo entrance
- Interactive map of Bitola Zoo
- 41.0146°N 21.3415°E
- Date opened: 1950
- Location: Bitola, North Macedonia
- No. of animals: 200
- No. of species: 40
- Website: www.zoobitola.mk

The Bitola Zoo, is a zoo in Bitola, North Macedonia. It was founded on 1 May 1950 with the help of zoos in Skopje, Zagreb, Belgrade and Subotica.

The Bitola zoo plays a significant role in the sphere of social living, especially in the sector of education as well as the protection of certain animal species. Ever since its establishment as an institution in 1950, the zoo has been constantly improving the conditions in order to meet European standards, but these standards have not yet been met. In 2004, a number of activities have started, aimed at improving the conditions in which the animals live and raising the educational character of the zoo.

== Recent criticism ==
During recent year, harsh critic has been directed towards the zoo from organisations such as OIPA International and Animalia Ohrid. They are asking the Macedonian Government to close down the zoo due to allegations such as the use of stray dogs as food, and visitor testimonies and photos of unhappy and starving animals.

== Gallery ==
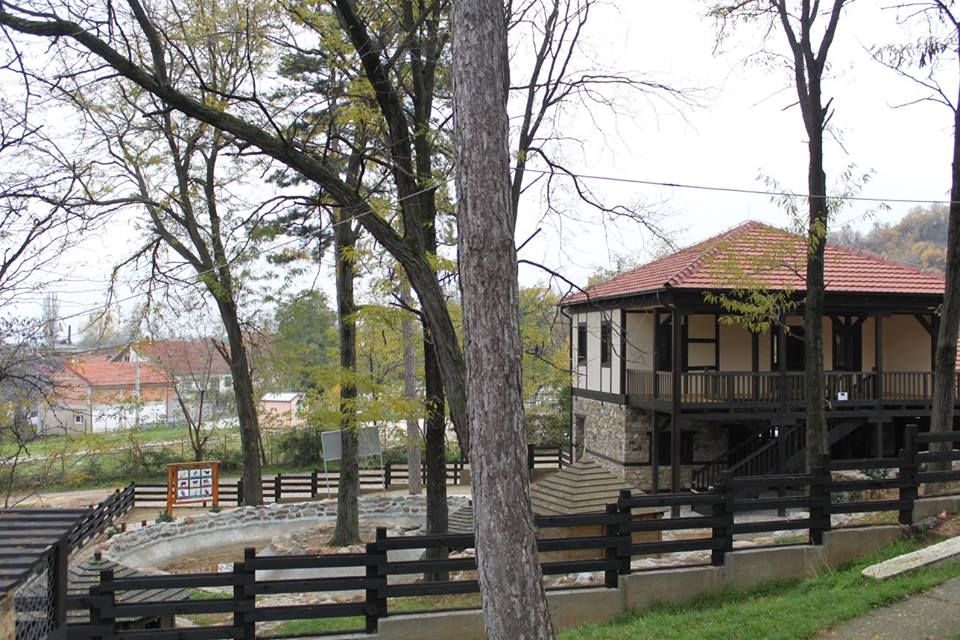
The farm house in Bitola Zoo

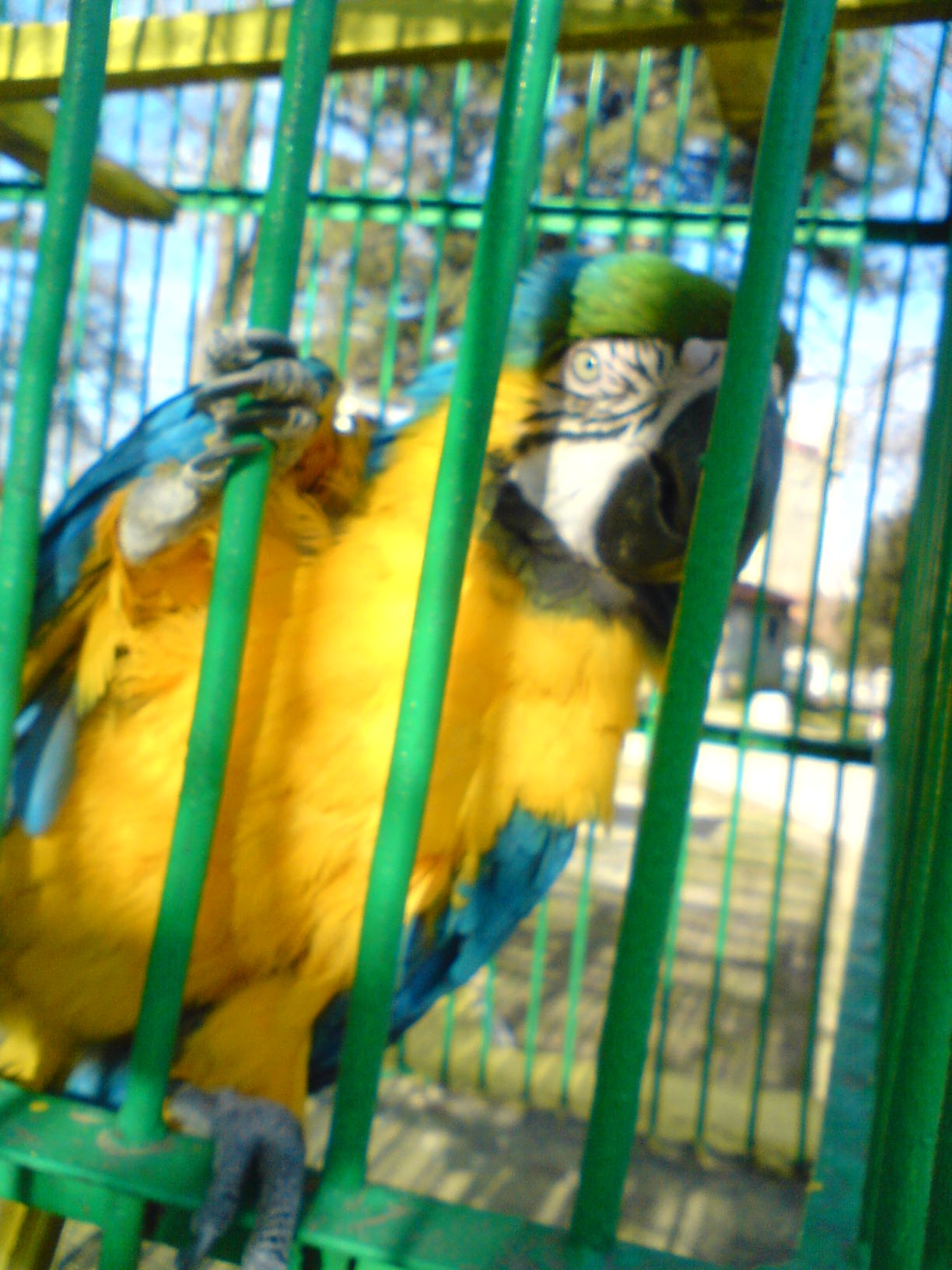
The macaw in Bitola Zoo

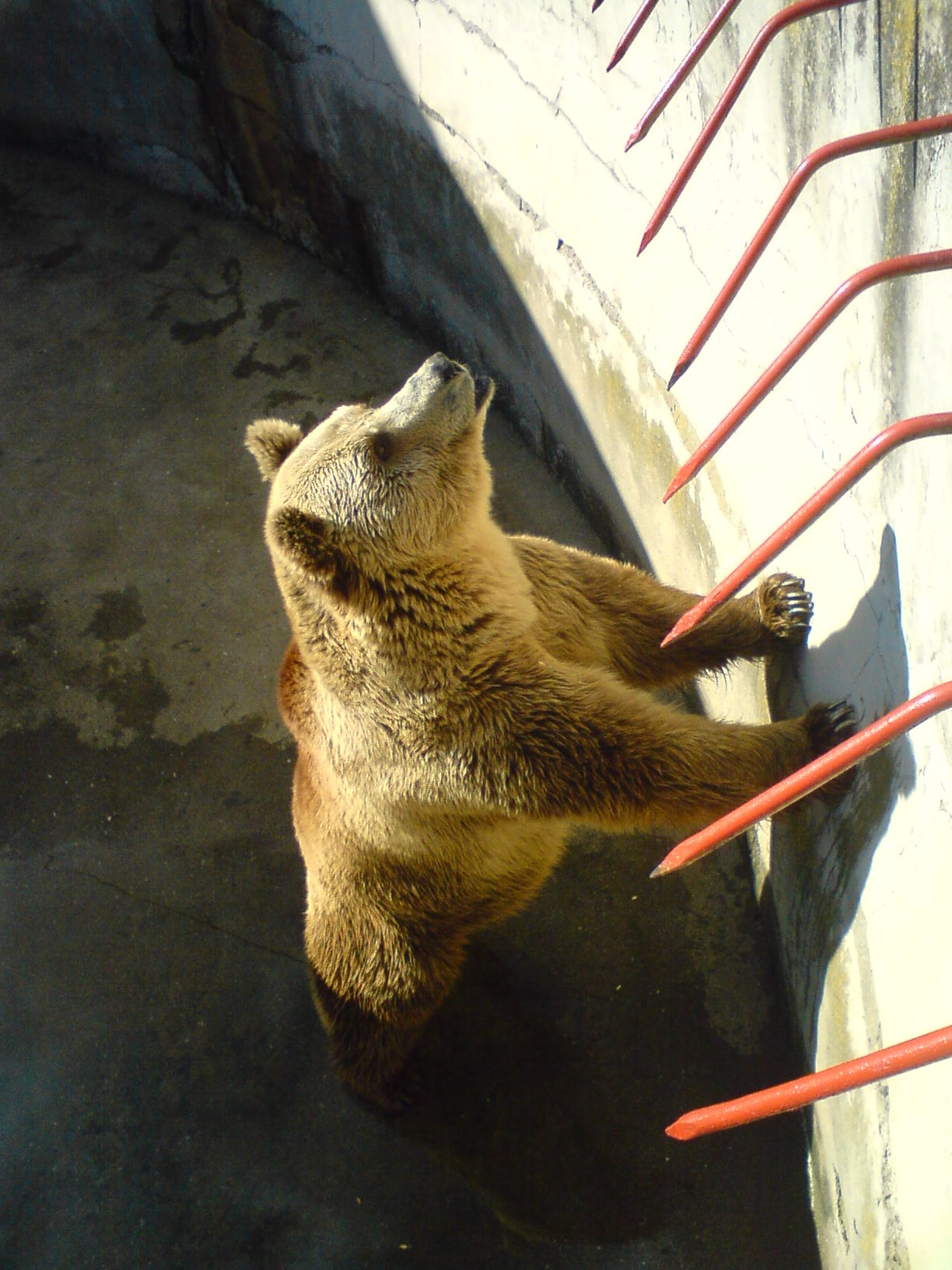
One of the four living bears in Bitola Zoo, which recently became a father.

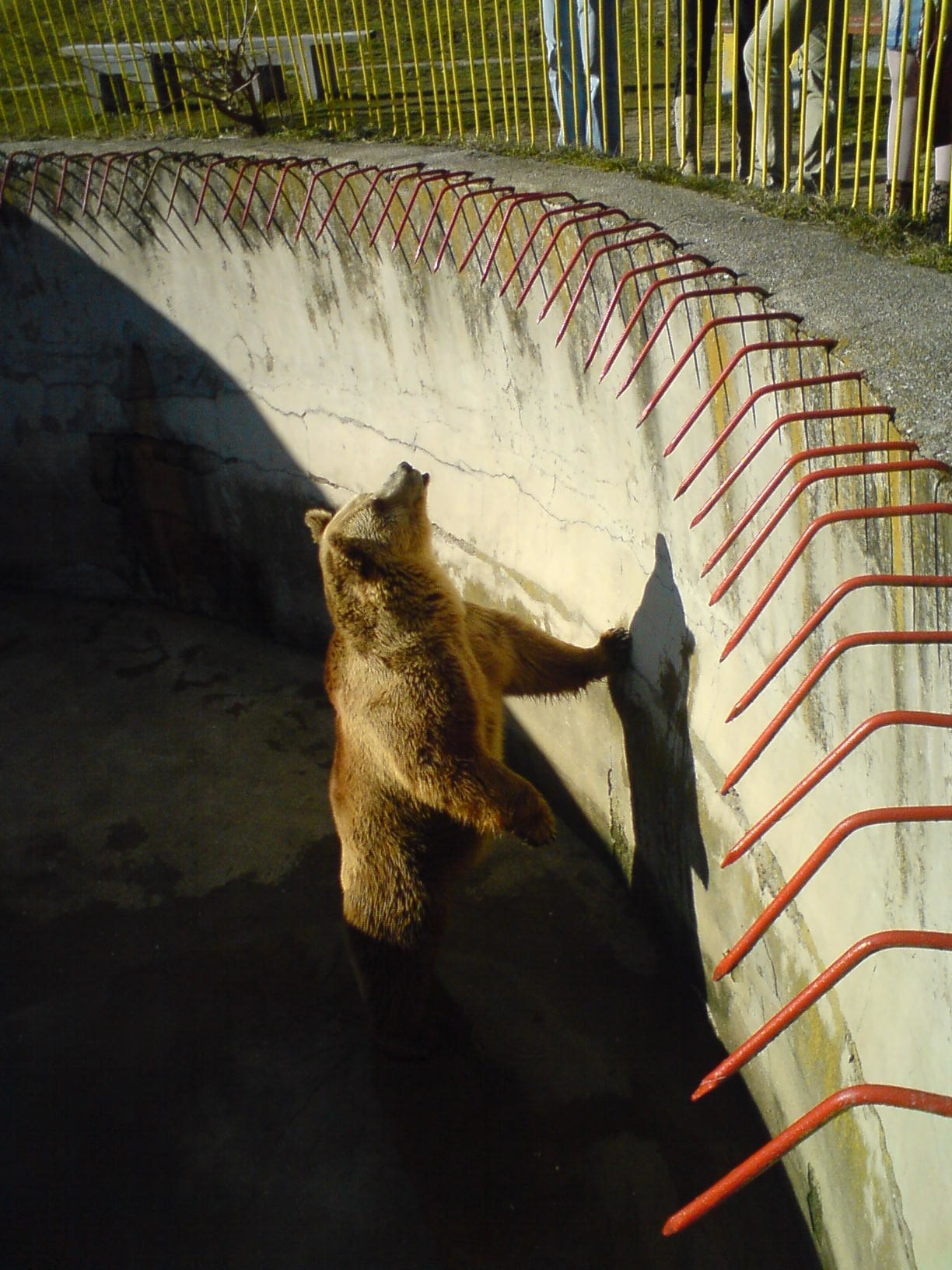
The same bear. Its cub is the first newborn in the zoo in the last 20 years.

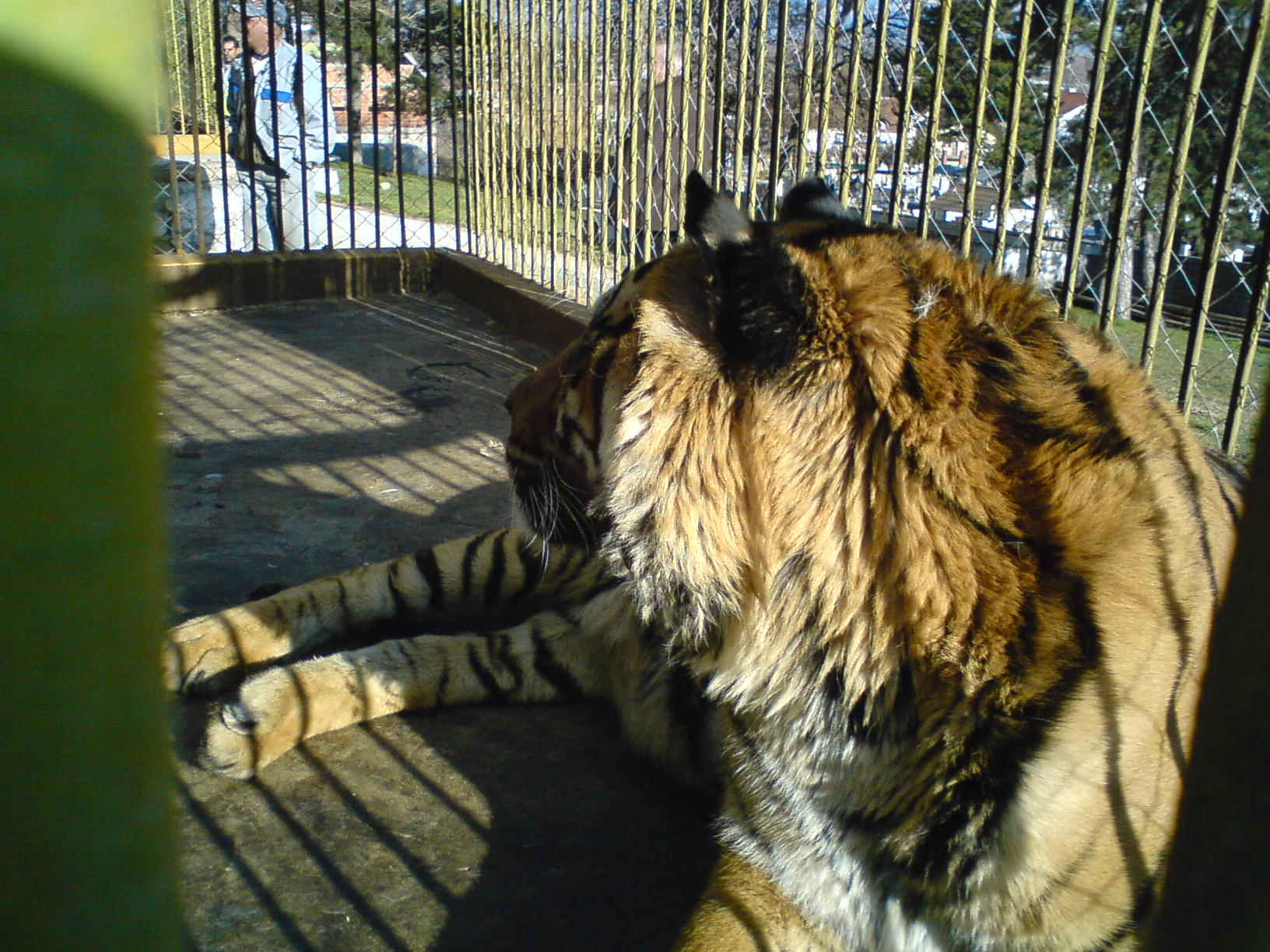
One of the three living tigers in Bitola Zoo.

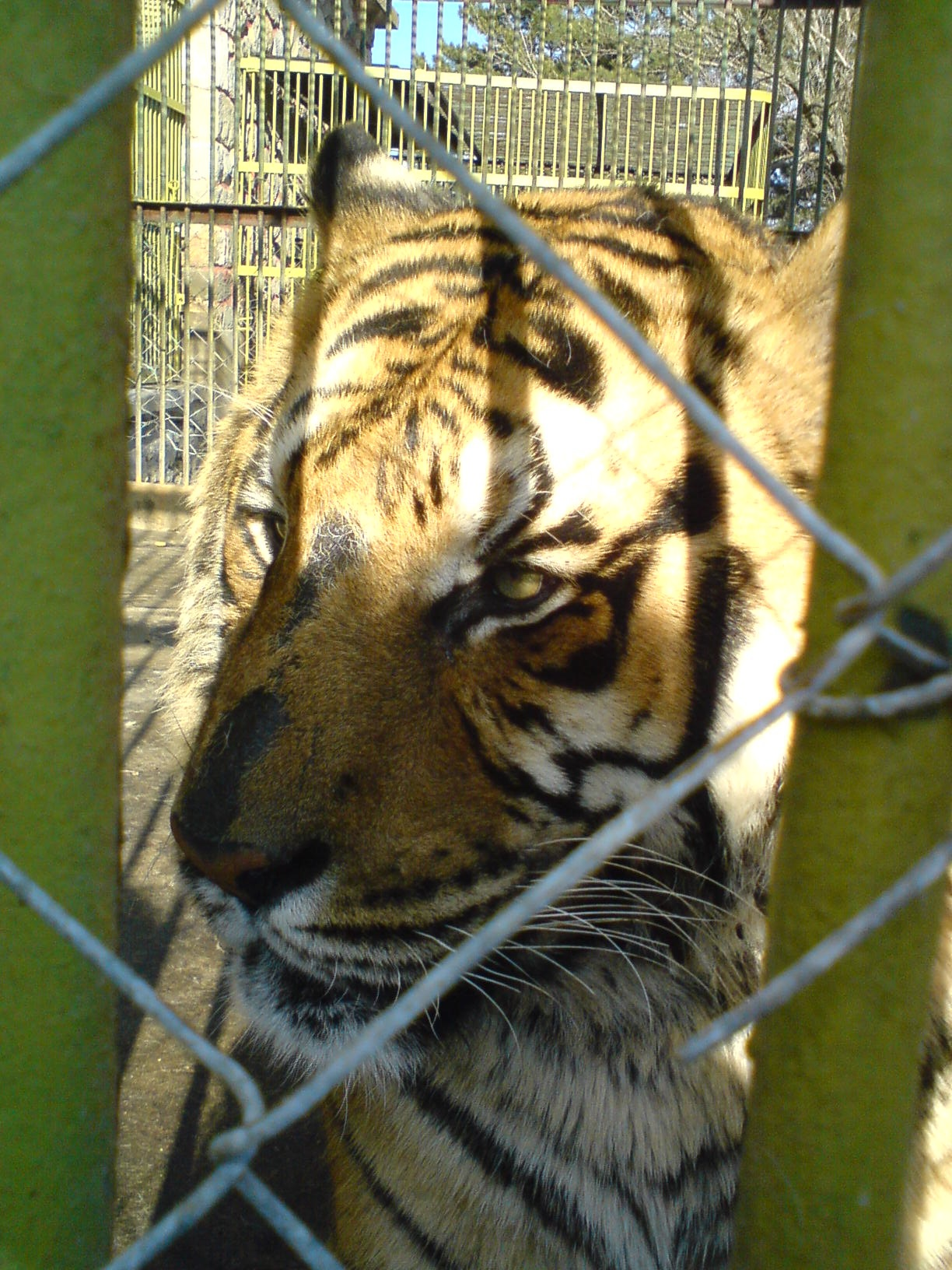
The same tiger. This one lives with his partner, while the other male lives alone.

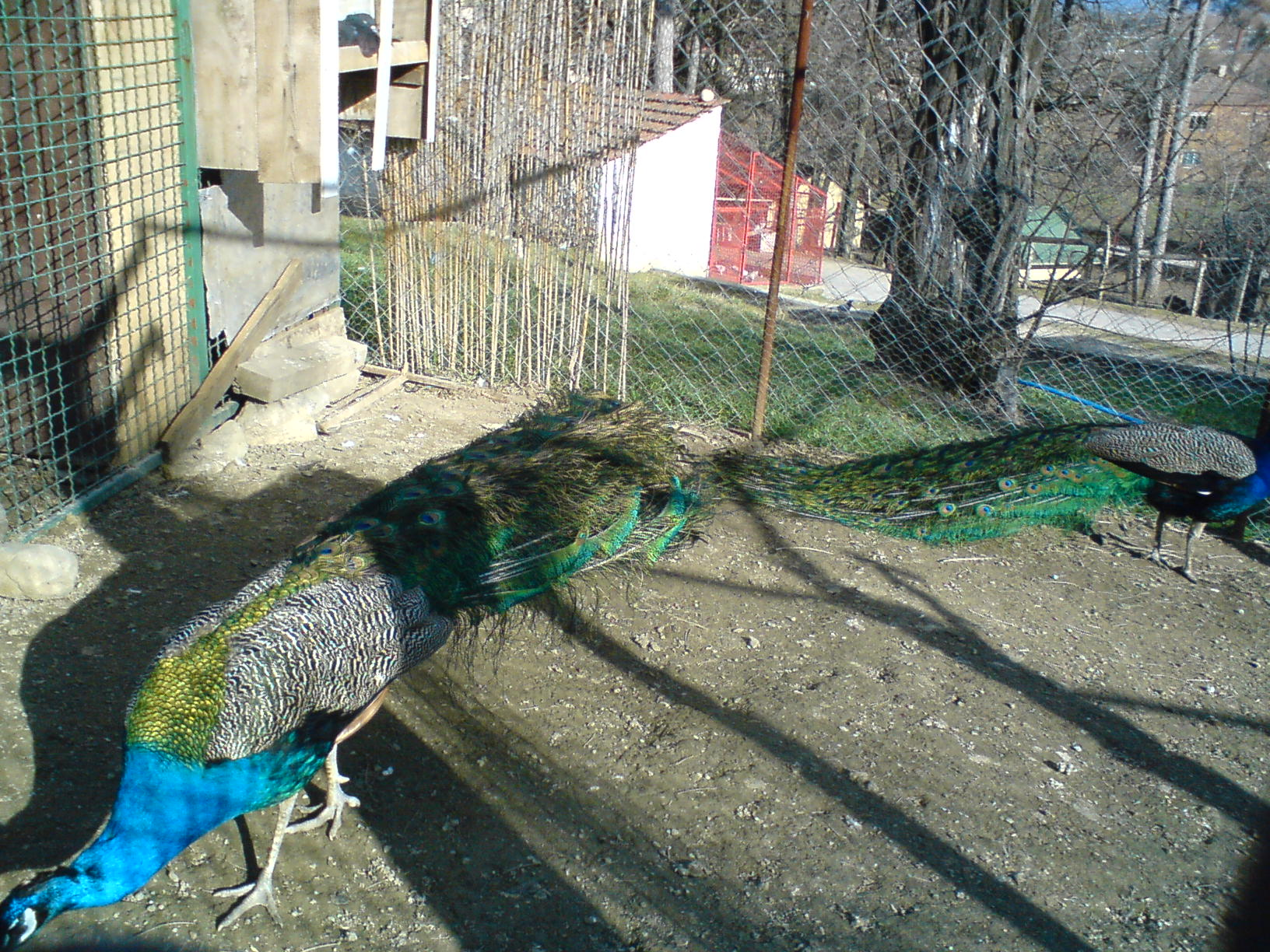
Two of the many peafowls found in Bitola zoo.

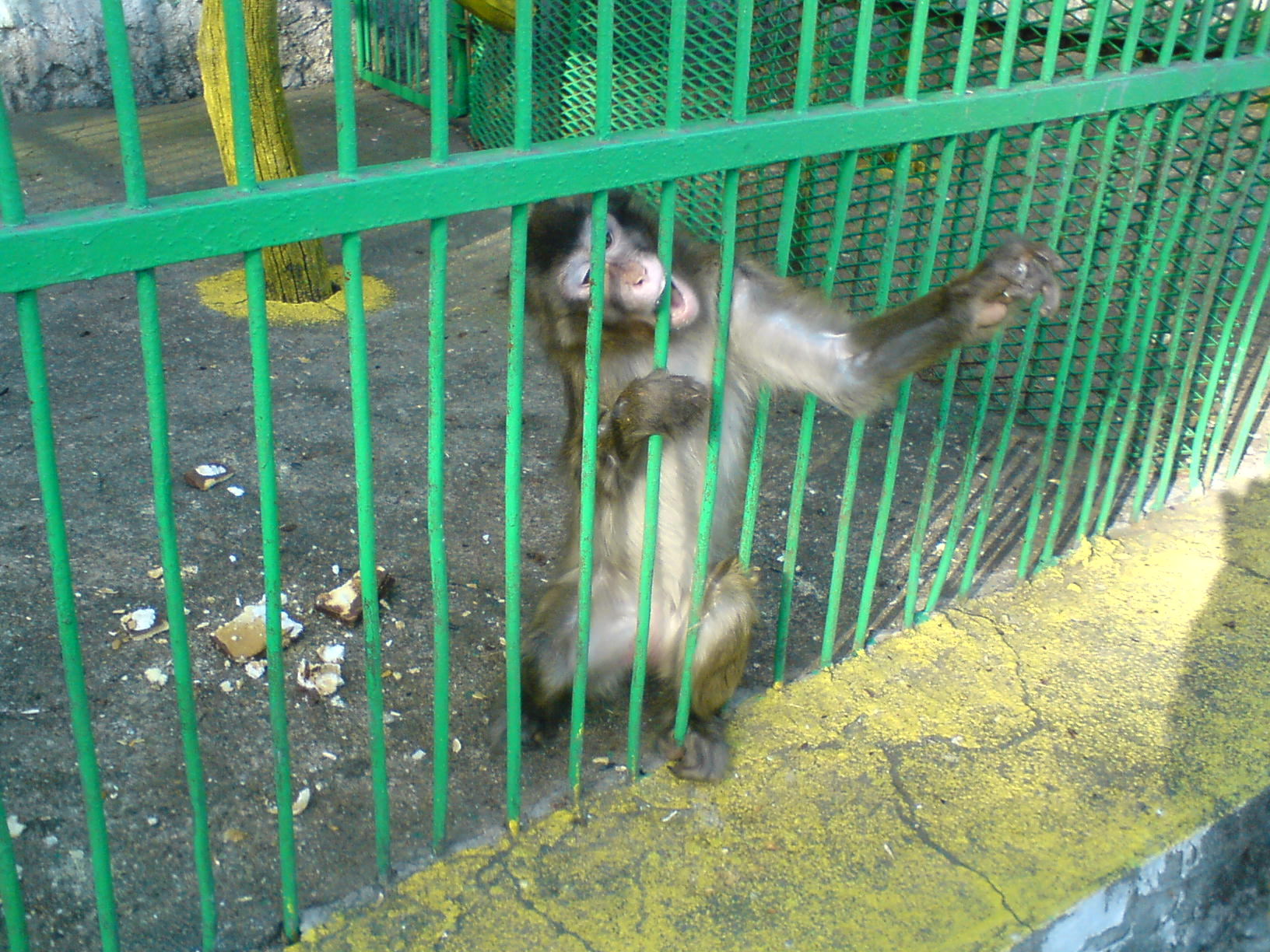
One of the tens of monkeys living in the zoo. This one has been known to steal things from unsuspecting visitors.

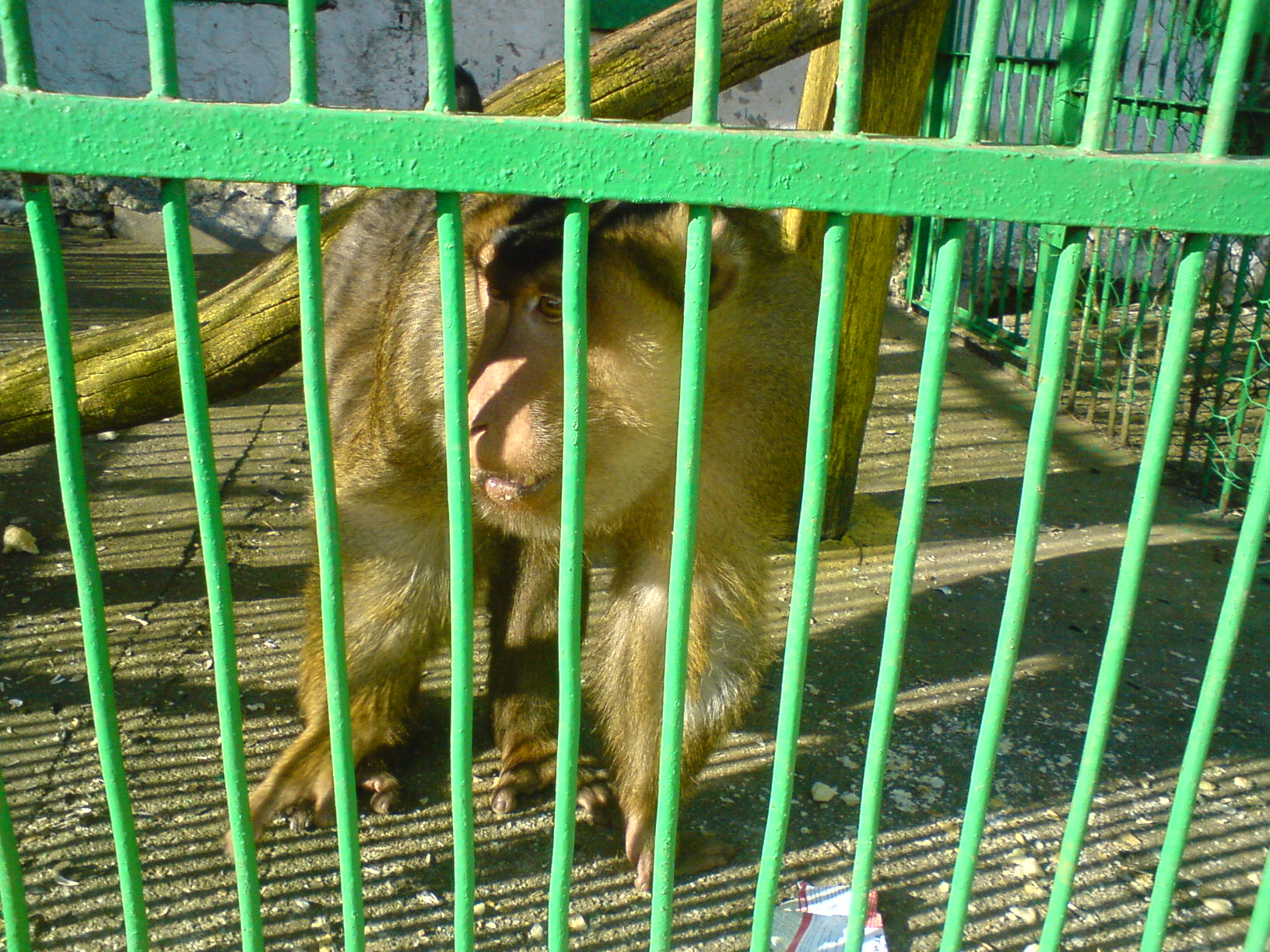
The biggest monkey in Bitola zoo. Also the oldest one.

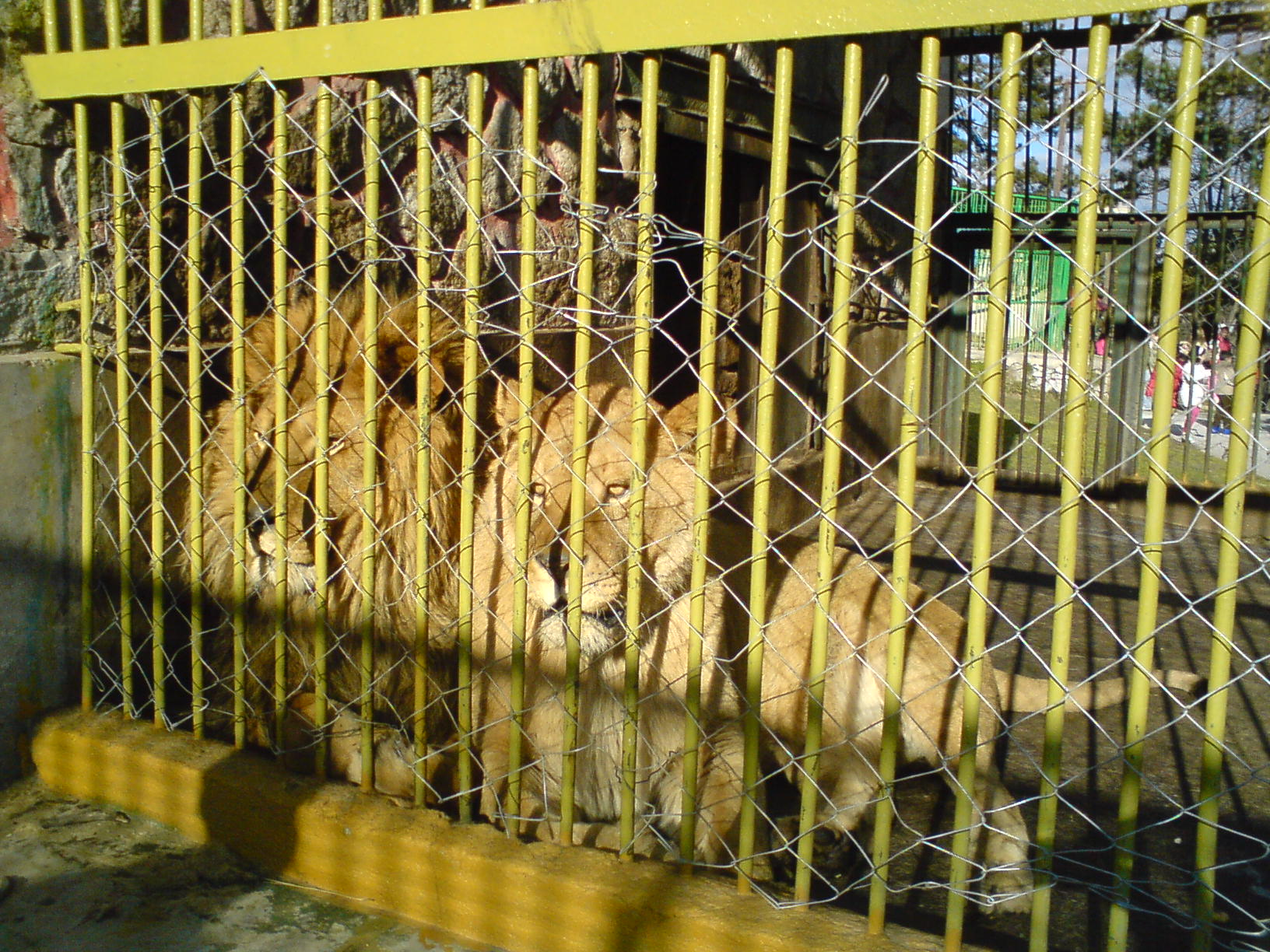
The two lions living in the zoo.

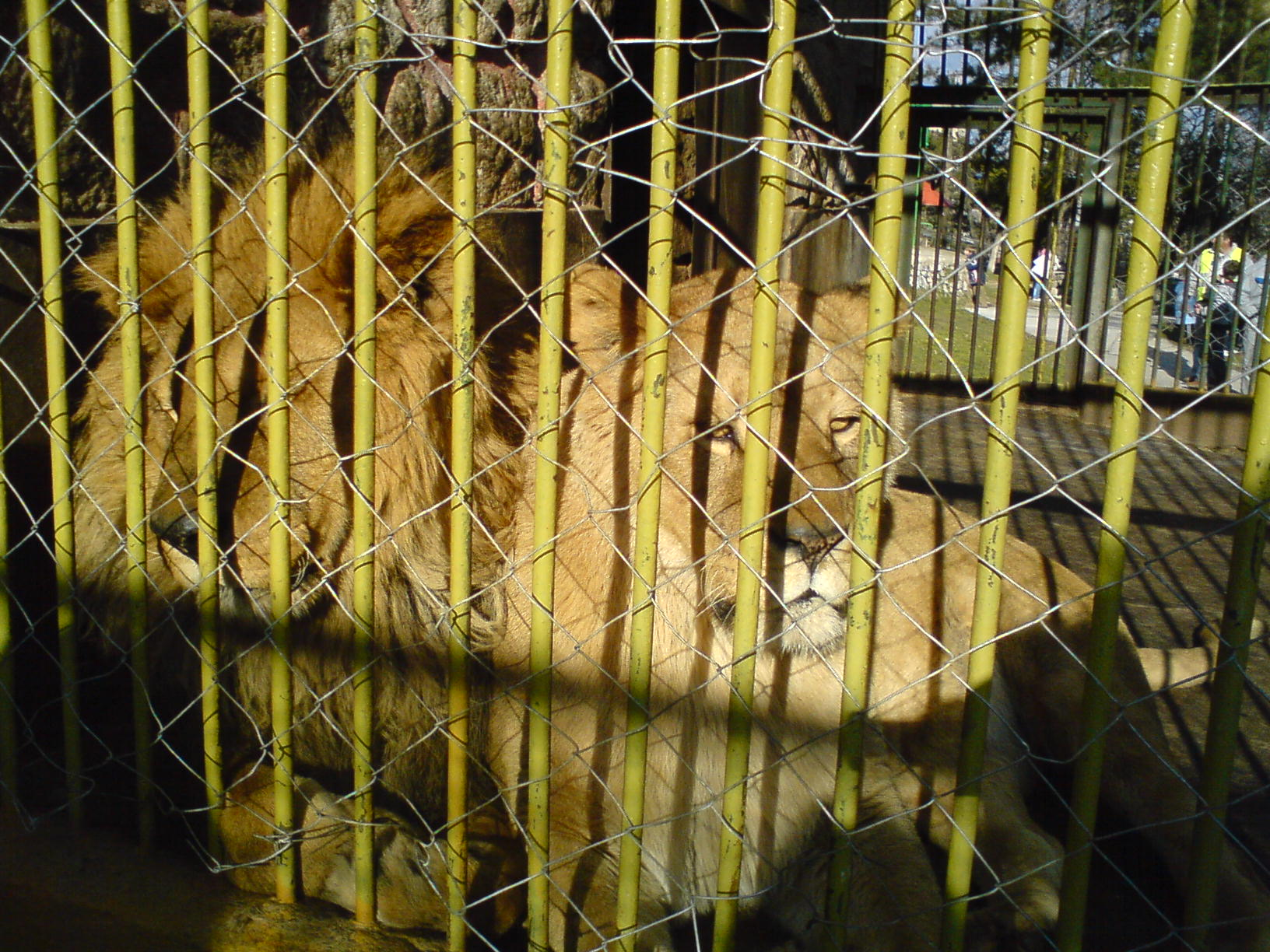
The lions in their cage.
