= List of zoo escapes =

The following is an incomplete list of notable incidents where one or multiple animals escaped from their enclosures at zoos.

== Australia ==
Year	Zoo	Location	Species	Time loose	Notes
2023	Australia Zoo	Beerwah, Queensland	Red-necked wallaby	3 days	The male, Dougle, escaped through a damaged fence during a thunderstorm.
2023	Perth Zoo	Perth, Western Australia	Silvery gibbon	30 minutes	
2022	Adelaide Zoo	Adelaide, South Australia	Red panda	2 days	The 7-year-old male Ravi was found two days after his escape in a tree in a nearby botanical park. The animal was tranquilised and brought back.
2022	Australian Reptile Park	Somersby, New South Wales	American alligator	Brief escape	
2022	Symbio Wildlife Park	Helensburgh, New South Wales	Red panda	Unknown	The 8-year-old female Kesari escaped after a tree fell in her enclosure. She died after being hit by a car.
2022	Taronga Zoo	Mosman, New South Wales	Lion	2.5 hours	During the “Roar and Snore” program, where guests pay to sleep 100 metres from the lion enclosure, four cubs and their father Ato were spotted outside of their exhibit. The zoo was put under a lockdown and the visitors were evacuated to a bathroom block until the animals returned, one cub was tranquilized.
2019	Melbourne Zoo	Melbourne, Victoria	Sumatran orangutan	Brief escape	The 15-year-old Malu briefly escaped. The zoo was put under lockdown.
2018	Perth Zoo	Perth, Western Australia	Ghost bat	50 minutes	
2018	Perth Zoo	Perth, Western Australia	Red panda	90 minutes	
2017	Australian Reptile Park	Somersby, New South Wales	Koala	Less than a day	The 2-year-old female Irene escaped her enclosure at the start of the mating season.
2017	Perth Zoo	Perth, Western Australia	Binturong	Unknown	A baby escaped twice through holes in its enclosure.
2017	Perth Zoo	Perth, Western Australia	Sumatran orangutan	15 minutes	A 5-year-old male fell over a barrier and into a garden bed. His mother dropped into the area to retrieve him before moving onto the visitor boardwalk and back into her exhibit. The zoo was placed in lockdown.
2016	Taronga Zoo	Mosman, New South Wales	Red-tailed black cockatoo	2 days	One bird escaped during the free flight show after being scared by a peregrine falcon. It was found in a backyard 20 km north of the zoo.
2015	Melbourne Zoo	Melbourne, Victoria	Sumatran orangutan	Less than a day	The 11-year-old Malu escaped into a secondary area before it was tranquilised. The zoo was put under lockdown.
2012	Australia Zoo	Beerwah, Queensland	Binturong	17 days	
2012	Ranger Red's Zoo & Conservation Park	Pinjarra, Western Australia	Tasmanian devil	Unknown	The three Tasmanian devils Itchy, Jamie and Genghis escaped after a falling tree knocked down the wall of their enclosure. One week later, Itchy and Jamie were found.
2012	Taronga Zoo	Mosman, New South Wales	Red-tailed black cockatoo	At least 2 days	Five birds escaped during the free flight show after being scared by sea eagles.
2011	Taronga Zoo	Mosman, New South Wales	Crab-eating macaque	10 minutes	
2009	Adelaide Zoo	Adelaide, South Australia	Sumatran orangutan	30 minutes	The 27-year-old Karta escaped her enclosure by short-circuiting an electric fence, but did not make it over a surrounding fence.
2008	Monarto Safari Park	Monarto, South Australia	White rhinoceros	Less than a day	The 18-year-old male Satara broke out to reach some female rhinos, but remained within a fenced zone. He was tranquilised and brought back to another enclosure.
2004	Mareeba Wild Animal Park	Kuranda, Queensland	Cheetah	Unknown	
1990	Taronga Zoo	Mosman, New South Wales	Clouded leopard	1 day	One clouded leopard escaped through a broken wire into a nearby concrete structure, where it feasted on pigeons until a zookeeper tranquilised the animal.
1973	Taronga Zoo	Mosman, New South Wales	Freshwater crocodile	1 day	Initially thought to have been stolen, the two reptiles actually had scaled a 2.5-metre tall mesh fence.
1972	Taronga Zoo	Mosman, New South Wales	Orangutan	1 hour	
1967	Taronga Zoo	Mosman, New South Wales	Northern plains gray langur	Unknown	The monkey escaped into nearby Bradley's Park where it was shot by zoo director Ron Strahan.
Mid-1950s	Taronga Zoo	Mosman, New South Wales	Chimpanzee	Less than a day	The ex-circus chimp Koko escaped her enclosure and trashed the interior of the office manager’s Ford Prefect until she was sedated with a bottle of chloroform by a zookeeper.
1946	Taronga Zoo	Mosman, New South Wales	Bengal tiger	Less than a day	The animal was shot.
1914	Melbourne Zoo	Melbourne, Victoria	Leopard	2 days	The leopard fled into a garden where it was shot dead after attacking a 17-year-old girl.

== Austria ==
Year	Zoo	Location	Species	Time loose	Notes
2022	Doppelmayr Zoo	Wolfurt	Red-necked wallaby	Unknown	
2022	Salzburg Zoo	Salzburg	African penguin	Several hours	A young penguin escaped in an unknown way and was found in a cornfield, about 800 metres away from the zoo.
2021	Salzburg Zoo	Salzburg	African penguin	4 days	The penguin was found emaciated on a path near the zoo. It was suspected that the animal had been stolen, because it is unknown how it could have escaped.
2021	Salzburg Zoo	Salzburg	Cheetah	Several hours	In early June, the two females Juvi and Raha escaped the zoo and wandered towards Anif, but came back after their mother called them. Although the zoo stated that the safety measures will be improved, one month later, Juvi escaped again. This time, she could be pushed back into her enclosure by zookeepers and the vet.
2012	Salzburg Zoo	Salzburg	Cheetah	Unknown	In June, two cheetahs escaped. In July, one of them managed to escape again briefly.
2012	Salzburg Zoo	Salzburg	Eurasian lynx	1 day	A Eurasian lynx named Vivious managed to escape after a storm damaged its enclosure.
2009	Schönbrunn Zoo	Vienna	Spectacled bear	15 minutes	The male Huan escaped for 15 minutes before he was tranquilized by a vet.

== Belgium ==
Year	Zoo	Location	Species	Time loose	Notes
2024	Unspecified	Unknown	Pink-backed pelican	2 weeks	The pelican made its way to the Netherlands, where it was captured on the golf course in Vught. The bird was taken to Safaripark Beekse Bergen to be picked up by its owner.
2023	Planckendael	Mechelen	Spotted hyena	Brief escape	A fallen tree allowed four hyenas to briefly escape their enclosure before the zoo was opened for visitors. The animals could quickly be lured back by caretakers.
2022	Planckendael	Mechelen	Bonobo	Less than a day	A male bonobo escaped, causing the zoo to be evacuated. After the ape was tranquilized, it was brought back and the park was reopened.
2020	Pairi Daiza	Brugelette	Wolf	Several hours	A 3-year-old wolf escaped for one night, before being recaptured the next morning. Local farmers were warned.
2018	Planckendael	Mechelen	Lion	3 hours	A lioness got out of her enclosure shortly after the zoo was opened, causing the zoo to be evacuated. After attempts to sedate her failed, the animal was shot.

== Brazil ==
Year	Zoo	Location	Species	Time loose	Notes
2012	Parque Municipal Danilo Galafassi	Cascavel	Capuchin monkey	At least 1 day	Eight monkeys escaped by smashing open the lock of their cage. One day later, four of them were recaptured.

== Bulgaria ==
Year	Zoo	Location	Species	Time loose	Notes
2014	Lovech Zoo	Lovech	Jaguar	6 hours	The animal was shot dead.
2014	Sofia Zoo	Sofia	Tiger	Less than a day	

== Canada ==
Year	Zoo	Location	Species	Time loose	Notes
2026	Calgary Zoo	Calgary, Alberta	Grizzly Bear	"A couple hours"	Fitz the Grizzly Bear briefly escaped his enclosure by climbing a 3 metre tall barrier before being tranquilized and safely relocated with no injuries.
2024	Greenview Park and Zoo	Morpeth, Ontario	Red kangaroo	3 hours	A kangaroo escaped the Greenview Zoo by unknown means before being spotted by an Amazon driver and being captured by the Ontario Provincial Police.
2023	Oshawa Zoo	Oshawa, Ontario	Eastern grey kangaroo	Four days	A kangaroo escaped while being transported by truck. It eluded capture for a week before being captured by Ontario Provincial Police.
2023	Waddles 'n' Wags Animal Haven	Eganville, Ontario	Serval	Never found	A serval escaped from a roadside zoo and is presumed dead.
2022	Greater Vancouver Zoo	Langley, British Columbia	Wolf	2 days	Two wolves escaped from the Greater Vancouver Zoo after a hole was cut in their enclosure. One was recovered safely while the other was struck by a car and killed.
2021	Papanack Park Zoo	Wendover, Ontario	Kangaroo	Unknown	A kangaroo escaped before being found seriously injured on a highway. It was euthanised.
2019	Roaring Cat Retreat	Lambton Shores, Ontario	Lion	Unknown	Two lion cubs escaped from an illegal zoo.
2019	Zoo Sauvage de St-Félicien	Saint-Félicien, Quebec	Wolverine	Unknown	This female wolverine was never recovered but in July of 2018, it was announced that a male wolverine escaped from the same zoo and was recovered later in August of 2018.
2017	Chippewa Park Wildlife Exhibit	Thunder Bay, Ontario	Bald eagle	Never found	Two bald eagles escaped after their enclosure was vandalized. One was never found.
2016	High Park Zoo	Toronto, Ontario	Capybara	35 days	Two capybaras, known as Bonnie and Clyde, escaped from the High Park Zoo. One was captured after 19 days while the other remained on the loose for 35 days.
2016	Papanack Park Zoo	Wendover, Ontario	Lion	2 hours	A lion managed to escape before being shot by police
2015	High Park Zoo	Toronto, Ontario	Indian peafowl	5 days	A peacock escaped his enclosure and explored Toronto before returning to the zoo
2013	Magnetic Hill Zoo	Moncton, New Brunswick	Indian peafowl	One week	
2013	Calgary Zoo	Calgary, Alberta	Hippopotamus	Several hours	The two hippopotamus escaped their enclosure during the 2013 flood, but were safely returned by the zoo staff.
2013	GuZoo Animal Farm	Three Hills, Alberta	Yak, sheep, coyote, ostrich, sika deer	A day	
2009	Greater Vancouver Zoo	Langley, British Columbia	Blue-and-yellow macaw	Three days	Chuva the macaw escaped his enclosure before hiding in an RV. The RV driver discovered the bird three days later and returned it to the zoo.
2008	Guha Exotic Animal Reserve	Huntsville, Ontario	Jaguar	1 day	A six-year-old jaguar escaped from the zoo, attacking a dog before being shot by police. The zoo is now closed.
2007	Safari Niagara	Stevensville, Ontario	Syrian brown bear	Several hours	
2007	Bergeron's Exotic Animal Sanctuary	Picton, Ontario	Japanese macaque	48 hours	Escaped before being tranquillised by a bylaw officer
2006	Chippewa Wildlife Exhibit	Thunder Bay, Ontario	Wolf	One week	A wolf escaped after jumping over its 8-foot fence. It was shot by police.
1997	Bear Creek Sanctuary	Barrie, Ontario	Tiger	2 days	A tiger escaped its enclosure. It was found two days later and tranquillized.
1997	Lickety Split Ranch and Zoo	London, Ontario	Tiger	4 hours	
1958	Hertel's Zoo	Nanaimo, British Columbia	Lion	1 day	The 2-year-old lioness Fury managed to escape the zoo in the night. The next day, she killed a little girl before the animal was shot by a hunter.
1958	Storybook Gardens	London, Ontario	California sea lion	10 days	A sea lion named Slippery managed to escape his enclosure, travelling into the United States before being caught in Toledo, Ohio.
1939	Calgary Zoo	Calgary, Alberta	California sea lion	3 months	A sea lion named Buster became a local celebrity after escaping from the Calgary Zoo and travelling through irrigation canals to Chestermere Lake and then to Bassano where he played with children.

== China ==
Year	Zoo	Location	Species	Time loose	Notes
2025	Yangzhou Zoo	Yangzhou	Capybara	2 months	Three capybaras escaped. While two of them were quickly caught by employees, the female Doubao managed to remain at large for two months, until she was caught in a trap and returned to the zoo.
2021	Beijing Zoo	Beijing	Giant panda	Brief escape	The 6-year-old panda Meng Lan climbed a 6 ft (1.8 m) tall fence, but did not make it into an area that was open for the public. She was lured back into her enclosure.
2021	Hangzhou Safari Park	Hangzhou	Leopard	At least 3 weeks	Three leopards escaped while a zookeeper cleaned their enclosure, it was kept a secret until seven days after they were spotted. Two of them were quickly recaptured, another one still wasn't found three weeks later.
2019	Hefei Wildlife Park	Hefei	Chimpanzee	Brief escape	
2011	?	Wuhu, Anhui	Siberian tiger	Brief escape	A zookeeper who had fed the tiger forgot to lock the gate to the tiger's enclosure. After escaping, the tiger roamed a nearby public park, before being tracked down and shot by police.
2002	Dongqian Lake Zoo	Ningbo	Wolf	2 months	Six wolves broke the wire net with teeth and claws and ran towards Guotongluan Mountain. All but one were killed.

== Colombia ==
Year	Zoo	Location	Species	Time loose	Notes
2023	Parque Temático Hacienda Nápoles	Medellín	Tiger	Brief escape	The tiger was shot.
2023	Ukumari Biopark	Pereira	Chimpanzee	Several hours	Two chimps called Pancho and Chita escaped and were shot dead.
1993	Hacienda Nápoles	Medellín	Hippopotamus	Never captured	After Pablo Escobar was killed, his hacienda was abandoned. Veterinarians removed the animals from his private zoo, except for the hippos which were deemed to dangerous to approach. The animals moved to Magdalena River, where they reproduced. Nowadays, more than 200 hippos live in Colombia.

== Czech Republic ==
Year	Zoo	Location	Species	Time loose	Notes
2025	Contact Zoopark	Zvole (Prague-West District)	Lion	Unknown	The male lion was shot by the police.
2023	Děčín Zoo	Děčín	Celebes crested macaque	Unknown	Nine macaques escaped their enclosure after the fence was damaged by a man under the influence of cannabis. Six of them escaped out of the zoo, all but two of them were recaptured two days later.
2021	Děčín Zoo	Děčín	Macaque	Several hours	
2021	Tábor Zoo	Tábor	European bison	Unknown	Seven bisons escaped after a falling tree damaged their enclosure's fence during a storm.
2018	Contact Zoopark	Zvole (Prague-West District)	Cougar	2 days	
2017	Contact Zoopark	Zvole (Prague-West District)	Cougar	1 day	
2012	Liberec Zoo	Liberec	Bengal tiger	Unknown	The white tiger Paris escaped its enclosure and attacked three employees before in was tranquilized. All victims were hospitalized, one suffered from a head injury, the other two had minor injuries.
2010	Olomouc Zoo	Olomouc	Japanese macaque	Unknown	The macaques Simpy and Tatin escaped from the zoo after the sound of a chainsaw panicked them. Simpy was recaptured about 8 months later in a tree around 150 kilometres West of the zoo.

== Denmark ==
Year	Zoo	Location	Species	Time loose	Notes
2025	Jyllands Park Zoo	Videbæk	Zebra	3 days	Three zebras escaped by kicking open a lock. Three days later, one of them was found in a cow herd about ten kilometres (6.2 miles) away from the zoo.
2025	Odense Zoo	Odense	Pink-backed pelican	Unknown	Two birds escaped through a hole. One day later, one of them was captured.
2020	Copenhagen Zoo	Copenhagen	Giant panda	Brief escape	Before the zoo was opened, the 7-year-old male Xing Er climbed up a metal pole and crawled out into the garden. Quickly, he was sedated.
2016	Blåvand Zoo	Varde Municipality	Barbary macaque	6 weeks	After fighting over female monkeys, the male macaque escaped the zoo. Six weeks later, he was found dead under a tree by summerhouse guests, probably because of a car accident. To prevent further escapes, the fences of the enclosure were improved.
2016	Odense Zoo	Odense	Black-capped squirrel monkey	Several hours	A troop of 24 monkeys escaped their enclosure, but could be lured back with food.
2015	Odense Zoo	Odense	Gentoo penguin	Brief escape	Five birds escaped their enclosure through a corridor meant for staff. When they reached a dead end, they returned to their enclosure. In the media, this escape attempt was compared to the escape attempts of the four penguins in the 2005 DreamWorks Animation film Madagascar.

== Estonia ==
Year	Zoo	Location	Species	Time loose	Notes
2023	Elistvere Animal Park	Tartu County	Wolf	Unknown	A 2-year-old female that was brought from Riga Zoo two days earlier escaped.
2012	Elistvere Animal Park	Tartu County	Lynx	Unknown	Three lynxes escaped after a tree fell onto one of the fences. A week later, two of them were still not found.
2007	Tallinn Zoo	Tallinn	Polar bear	Brief escape	The 20-year-old male Franz walked out of his enclosure and was spotted between the cage and the safety barrier after a zookeeper forgot to lock his cage. He was tranquilised by zookeepers and brought back to his enclosure, where Franz died of heart failure.

== Finland ==
Year	Zoo	Location	Species	Time loose	Notes
2023	Korkeasaari Zoo	Helsinki	Boa constrictor	6 months	Pedro, a Brazilian rainbow boa, escaped from its enclosure in the Amazoina House in july 2023. It was speculated that the boa was still inside the tropical house. Pedro was later found in the sewers. The boa was a pet before arriving at Korkeasaari.
2017	Korkeasaari Zoo	Helsinki	Peacock	2 weeks	A Peacock escaped from Korkeasaari and spent about two weeks on the neighboring island of Mustikkamaa. The 14-year-old male peacock escaped the animal island either by flying or by crossing the bridge, but no attempt was made to chase it back to the zoo.
2010	Korkeasaari Zoo	Helsinki	Wolverine	Few hours	The wolverine escaped from its enclosure, even though there was no need for people to fear the runaway, causing the zoo to close for a few hours. The operation to capture the escapee involved, among others, the Navy vessel Harus, which located the animal on the ice off the coast of Kuninkaansaari. It was found approximately six kilometers south of Korkeasaari.
2005	Korkeasaari Zoo	Helsinki	Baboon	1 hour	During the power outage, the baboon Tuhtimo escaped from his cage. The animal was first given a sedative injection and later a lethal injection because, according to the veterinarian, the leader of the herd would not have accepted him among the others.

== France ==
Year	Zoo	Location	Species	Time loose	Notes
2025	Amnéville Zoo	Amnéville	Steller's sea eagle	At least several days	The eagle Ryu went missing during a free-flight training session and was spotted several days later at the France–Luxembourg border.
2022	Espace zoologique de Saint-Martin-la-Plaine	Saint-Martin-la-Plaine	Red panda	12 days	The animal was found by the fire brigade in Génilac.
2021	Trois Vallées zoo	Montredon-Labessonnié	Wolf	Unknown	A pack of wolves escaped after destroying the safety hatches on their enclosure. Four were shot and killed, while five were tranquillized.
2019	Espace zoologique de Saint-Martin-la-Plaine	Saint-Martin-la-Plaine	Red panda	2 days	Because of heavy snowfall, the 3-year-old male could escape from the park. About 10 kilometres (6 miles) from the zoo, the animal could be recaptured in a garden.
2018	Paris Zoological Park	Paris	Guinea baboon	Several hours	50 baboons escaped, causing the zoo to be temporarily shut down.

== Georgia ==
Year	Zoo	Location	Species	Time loose	Notes
2015	Tbilisi Zoo	Tbilisi	Hippopotamus, tiger, brown bear, pig, lion, hyena	Multiple days	Over half the animals from the Tbilisi zoo either escaped or were killed during the 2015 Tbilisi flood. One of the tigers mauled a man to death while eluding capture.

== Germany ==
Year	Zoo	Location	Species	Time loose	Notes
2026	Affenwald Straußberg	Sondershausen	Barbary macaque	6 days	A 16-year old motorcyclist was slightly injured after trying to dodge the monkey when it crossed a road.
2026	Hanover Zoo	Hanover	Northern plains gray langur	Brief escape	One female got scared of an Asian small-clawed otter and jumped out of the enclosure. She returned by herself.
2026	Krefeld Zoo	Krefeld	Serval	Less than a day	
2026	Naturwildpark Granat	Haltern am See	Lynx	2 weeks	The 2-year-old animal Mikaesch escaped because of a power outage. After attacking a pedestrian and their dog, it was shot. The killing of the animal sparked heated discussions.
2026	Wuppertal Zoo	Wuppertal	Red panda	1 day	The male Liam escaped and climbed on a tree near the "Rivers of Sulawesi" area, which is still under construction. After a failed attempt to catch him, Liam returned to his enclosure by himself.
2025	Affenwald Straußberg	Sondershausen	Barbary macaque	3 weeks	The 15-year old male Golem escaped by climbing over a fence after he lost out in territorial disputes within the monkey troop.
2025	Frankfurt Zoological Garden	Frankfurt	Sumatran orangutan	1 hour	Four orangutans could escape because of a technical defect. The zoo was evacuated, the animals could be lured back into their enclosure by zookeepers.
2025	Tierpark Ueckermünde	Ueckermünde	Barbary macaque	2 days	Ten monkeys escaped, probably through an open gate.
2025	Tierpark Wolgast	Wolgast	Porcupine	4 days	The porcupine Klette escaped two times.
2025	Wildtierpark Edersee	Edertal	Wolf	Unknown	A female wolf panicked and jumped over the fence of her enclosure when the veterinarian treated another wolf. To prevent her escape from the zoo's area, she was shot after efforts to catch or tranquilize her had failed.
2025	Wuppertal Zoo	Wuppertal	Red panda	Unknown	The male Liam escaped.
2024	Cologne Zoological Garden	Cologne	Red panda	Less than a day	The male Barney escaped and climbed on a tree until he was brought down by firefighters.
2024	Dortmund Zoo	Dortmund	Indian crested porcupine	5 days	The two porcupines Wilma and Barry escaped in the night through an open door. While Barry was recaptured the next morning, Wilma had to be searched for with sniffer dogs.
2024	Dortmund Zoo	Dortmund	Red panda	2 days	The male Chenpo escaped until he was recaptured by firefighters in a tree near the zoo.
2024	Tierpark Cux-Art	Beverstedt	Porcupine	2 weeks	Nine porcupines escaped. All but one were recaptured quickly. The animal was spotted by inhabitants as far as 20 kilometres (12.4 miles) away from the zoo until it was found dead on the A27.
2023	Tierpark Nadermann	Delbrück	Cheetah	10 minutes	Two cheetahs escaped their enclosures due to carelessness of the staff. They went into the neighbouring enclosure, where they ate a guinea pig. Because of being trained, the cheetahs could be led back into their enclosure by zookeepers.
2023	Tierpark Weißwasser	Weißwasser	Arctic fox	Less than a day	The fox fell asleep on a street in Weißkeißel before being recaptured.
2022	Wildpark Gangelt	Gangelt	Lynx	3 days	After their enclosure was damaged by a falling tree during a storm, three lynx escaped. Two of them were captured quickly, the third one, a female called Jumper, roamed free for three days before it also was tranquilized and brought back to the enclosure.
2021	Duisburg Zoo	Duisburg	Red panda	2 days	The male Jang probably used a plant to climb out of his enclosure. He was recaptured by firefighters in a tree near the panda enclosure.
2021	Klimahaus	Bremerhaven	Nile monitor	3 days	The 0,8-metre-long monitor lizard escaped through an open door. Three days later, it was found in the jungle section of the Cameroon area near its enclosure under a multi-layer floor covering.
2021	Nuremberg Zoo	Nuremberg	Eurasian lynx	Unknown	The lynx could escape because the electrical circuit of the electric fence around the enclosure had been interrupted. The animal went into the neighbouring enclosure, where it killed three adult blackbucks and injured a calf. The lynx died, after it was tranquilized and brought back to its enclosure
2021	Tatzmania Löffingen	Löffingen	Barbary macaque	Several hours	About two dozen escaped their enclosure and roamed the zoo before being recaptured several hours later.
2020	Osnabrück Zoo	Osnabrück	Porcupine	1 week	The 4.5-month-old male Ben was found in a garden in Schölerberg one week after his escape
2019	Magdeburg Zoo	Magdeburg	Chimpanzee	1 hour	Two chimps called Sambala and Sokoto escaped and stayed on the roof of the chimpanzee house and on the nets spanning their enclosure. The visitors of the zoo could be brought to safety, the animals could be lured back into their enclosure.
2019	Naturwildpark Granat	Haltern am See	Lynx	Several months	The animal could escaped through a hole that unknown people had cut into the fence. Months later, it was recaptured in Bochum.
2019	Thüringer Zoopark Erfurt	Erfurt	Cheetah	Several hours	After a falling branch destroyed the fence during a storm, two cheetah cubs escaped their enclosure. The next morning, the two could be brought back to their mother, one had to be tranquilized.
2019	Tierpark Berlin	Berlin	Golden-bellied capuchin	4 days	The 6-year-old Philippa and the 17-year-old Obi escaped through a small gap. Three days later, Philippa was captured near the monkey house, while Obi made her way to Biesdorf train station where she was captured one day after Philippa's capture.
2018	Eifel Zoo	Lünebach	Lion, jaguar, tiger, Asian black bear	Several hours	Multiple animals escaped from the private zoo during a flash flood. One bear was shot and the other animals were captured.
2018	Natur- und Tierpark Brüggen	Brüggen	Red-necked wallaby	4 days	A male called Jack escaped one day before his dentist appointment.
2018	Osnabrück Zoo	Osnabrück	Guereza	Six days	Two female guerezas escaped over the 3.5 metres wide moat of their enclosure. After several days, they came back by themself.
2018	Tierpark Perleberg	Perleberg	Wolf	3 weeks	
2017	Osnabrück Zoo	Osnabrück	Brown × polar bear hybrid	10 minutes	Hybrid bear Tips broke through an electric fence and squeezed through an opening that was only about 40 cm in size into the silver fox enclosure. She then broke through a bear-proof fence in order to get back to an area she was familiar with. Tips was then shot by an employee.
2017	Osnabrück Zoo	Osnabrück	Black-headed spider monkey	4 hours	A female monkey had been swinging so hard on a climbing rope on the enclosure that the animal jumped onto a neighboring tree outside the enclosure. The area around the enclosured was blocked for visitors, till the animal returned to its group independently.
2017	Tierpark Bretten	Bretten	European fallow deer, Wallaby	9 days	Five wallabies and four deer escaped.
2017	ZOOM Erlebniswelt	Gelsenkirchen	Eurasian lynx	5 days	Lynx Findus escaped over a frozen moat. After he was not discovered in the zoo, people were advised to keep distance from the animal and call the zoo when discovering it. Five days later, Findus was discovered in Herne, only several hundred metres away from the zoo. He was tranquilized and brought back to his enclosure.
2016	Berlin Zoo	Berlin	Abyssinian ground hornbill	10 minutes	The 15-year-old male Clyde used a gust of wind to escape his enclosure.
2016	Leipzig Zoological Garden	Leipzig	Lion	Less than a day	Two young lions escaped in the morning and hid in a bush on the zoo's area, before the zoo was opened for visitors. One could be pushed back into their enclosure, the other had to be shot.
2016	Tierpark Wittenberg	Wittenberg	Coati	6 days	Two coatis escaped.
2016	Wildpark Johannesmühle	Baruth/Mark	Lion	2 hours	Lion Massai and lioness Gretchen escaped through an open door, the zoo was evacuated. Massai could be pushed back into his enclosure. Gretchen, who had been trapped in a security area, had to be tranquilized.
2016	Wuppertal Zoo	Wuppertal	Snow leopard	Less than a day	Male snow leopard Irbis could escape because of a cage door that was not closed properly. His escape was quickly discovered, the visitors were told to go in the zoo's buildings and the zoo was temporarily closed. The animal was tranquilized and brought back into its enclosure.
2015	Duisburg Zoo	Duisburg	Bornean orangutan	15 minutes	The 26-year-old male Nieas could escape his enclosure because of an unlocked door. He then went into another enclosure and began fighting with the 12-year-old male Bayu. Nieas then flew through an open skylight, wandering around the zoo in panic. A zookeeper saw him and alarmed the other staff, who then tried to tranquilize the ape. Nieas had to be shot because he tried to escape over an external fence, Bayu could be tranquilized and brought back to its enclosure.
2015	Osnabrück Zoo	Osnabrück	Coati	1 week	In this year, the coati Norbert escaped two times by climbing out of his outer enclosure and escaped into the nearby forest. The first time he was brought back by firefighters, the second time he was captured by a zookeeper.
2015	Osnabrück Zoo	Osnabrück	Silver fox	1 week	A female fox escaped through a slot in the fence of the enclosure and moved East through several red fox territories. After one week, it was captured in Bünde.
2015	Zoo Halle	Halle (Saale)	Chimpanzee	Less than a day	The 42-year-old female Banghi escaped. All visitors were brought into safety while the chimp could be lured into a neighbouring enclosure, where it was tranquilized.
2014	Tierpark Greifswald	Greifswald	Porcupine	1 week	The 9-month-old male Hartmut escaped together with other porcupines, but was the only one to avoid capture. One week later, he was run over by a train only 500 metres (0.3 miles) away from the zoo.
2013	Cologne Zoological Garden	Cologne	Colombian red howler	2 hours	The animal escaped through a hole in his fence, but returned independently.
2013	Leipzig Zoological Garden	Leipzig	Cheetah	Less than a day	The cheetah jumped over a wall and injured a donkey. It was tranquilized and brought back to its enclosure. After that, the zoo's security measures were improved.
2013	Osnabrück Zoo	Osnabrück	Guereza	13 days	The female Lubaya escaped and wandered around the area near the zoo, probably to found a new territory. She was seen by inhabitants in the forest and in gardens, some even fed her cooked potatoes and rice. After nearly two weeks, zookeepers were able to lure her into a cellar, where she was captured.
2013	Straussberg Adventure Park	Sondershausen	Barbary macaque	5 days	Three male macaques called Fred, Richard and Paul fled their enclosure in order to escape the aggressive alpha male Cornelius. They were recaptured and castrated.
2013	Tierpark Perleberg	Perleberg	Wolf	2 days	After failing to capture the animal, it was shot dead.
2012	Berlin Zoo	Berlin	Marabou stork	Brief escaped	The marabou escaped briefly to get some fish at the feeding of the sea lions.
2012	Cologne Zoological Garden	Cologne	Cheetah	20 minutes	The male Nelson escaped by jumping over a 2.5 m (8.2 ft) high fence into the neighbouring flamingo enclosure.
2012	Hanover Zoo	Hanover	Chimpanzee	1 hour	In May, the male Toto escaped, but returned independently. Two months later, five chimps escaped and wandered around the zoo. The visitors were brought into indoor areas. A 5-year-old girl was hospitalized after one of the apes knocked her down. Four chimps returned to their enclosure independently, the last one could be lured back by zookeepers.
2012	Nuremberg Zoo	Nuremberg	Cheetah	1 day	A young cheetah jumped over the electric fence of its enclosure after being scared by zookeepers that tried to help its injured sibling. One day later, visitors discovered the animal in a forest near the goitered gazelle enclosure, where it was captured by the zoo's employees.
2012	Tierpark Rheinböllen	Rheinböllen	Red-necked wallaby	Unknown	Two wallabies escaped from the zoo through holes dug by a fox and a boar.
2011	Münster Zoo	Munster	African penguin	1 day	The 3-month-old female (later named Leona) escaped on New Year's Day and ended up in the lion enclosure. The lions didn't pose a threat as they were dozing in their house.
2008	Opel Zoo	Kronberg im Taunus	Red panda	2 days	One couple escaped by using bamboo plants to climb over the fence of their enclosure.
2008	Osnabrück Zoo	Osnabrück	Hudson Bay wolf	2 hours (second time)	Wolf Roy escaped two times by jumping over a fence. The second time, he was captured in Voxtrup near the A 33.
2005	Hanover Zoo	Hanover	Red panda	Unknown	One red panda escaped into the forest nearby. It was tranquilized and brought back.
2005	ZOOM Erlebniswelt	Gelsenkirchen	Eastern wolf	1 week	A 2-year-old female escaped after a fight in her pack by jumping over a 3.5 m (11.5 ft) high wall. A week later, the animal was run over by a car on the A42.
2004	Berlin Zoo	Berlin	Western gorilla	Unknown	The 8-year-old male Bokito climbed over a three-metre glass wall.
2004	Hanover Zoo	Hanover	Northern plains gray langur	Less than a day	Four monkeys escaped. One was captured, the others came back independently.
2004	Tiergarten Mönchengladbach	Mönchengladbach	Unspecified monkey	Several hours	One little monkey escaped one night through a gap between the bars of its cage. It managed to turn off the heating of the monkey house.
2003	Berlin Zoo	Berlin	Spectacled bear	30 minutes	The male Juan escaped by dragging a trunk into the water-filled moat of his enclosure. He went to the zoo's playground, where he was tranquilised by zookeepers.
2003	Tierpark Berlin	Berlin	Barbary macaque	2 days	Eleven monkeys escaped their enclosure, two of them even got out of the zoo. All but one of them were captured the same day.
2002	Hanover Zoo	Hanover	Asian elephant	Less than a day	The female Dunja was able to climb on the pool drain and escape. She was lured back into her enclosure.
2002	Krefeld Zoo	Krefeld	Cheetah	Several hours	Two cheetahs called Urs and Katrin escaped after burglars broke open the door of their enclosure. While Urs hid in a bush, Katrin managed to get into the grey kangaroo enclosure where it killed ten animals and bit another one. The next morning, Urs was lured back into his enclosure while Katrin was tranquilised.
2001	Berlin Zoo	Berlin	Coati	Unknown	The coati escaped three times in that year. At the end of its last escape, the animal was captured in the Landeskriminalamt.
2000	Nuremberg Zoo	Nuremberg	Polar bear	3.5 hours	Four bears escaped and wandered through the zoo after unknown people cracked the locks of their cages open shortly before the closure of the zoo. The bears, that were only borrowed from Karlsruhe Zoo, had to be shot after tranquilisation attempts had failed.
1999	Berlin Zoo	Berlin	Japanese macaque	Less than a day	
1996	Berlin Zoo	Berlin	California sea lion	Several nights	One sea lion escaped its enclosure repeatedly at nighttime to lay on the zoo's benches.
1994	Berlin Zoo	Berlin	Chimpanzee	Unknown	
1989	Berlin Zoo	Berlin	Chimpanzee	Unknown	The male Pedro climbed over the wall of his enclosure with the help of a hose.
1988	Cologne Zoological Garden	Cologne	Grizzly bear	Less than a day	The bear escaped by knocking down a tree, with which he could pass a moat. 4000 Visitors had to be evacuated until a zookeeper shot the animal dead.
1985	Cologne Zoological Garden	Cologne	Chimpanzee	Less than a day	The pair Petermann and Susi escaped because of the carelessness of a zookeeper. After Petermann attacked and nearly killed director Gunther Nogge, both animals were shot dead.
1983	Berlin Zoo	Berlin	Brown bear	Less than a day	The female Petzi wandered through the zoo after climbing a 2.5 m (8.2 ft) high wall. She was tranquilised in the Egyptian goose enclosure.
1975	Cologne Zoological Garden	Cologne	Jaguar	Less than a day	Three jaguars escaped their enclosure and wandered through the zoo. One animal that attacked a zookeeper was shot by the police, the other two were recaptured.
1973	Karlsruhe Zoo	Karlsruhe	Brown bear	Unknown	Four bears escaped, one of them was killed.
Late 1960s	Phantasialand	Brühl (Rhineland)	Lion	Brief escape	The animal escaped when the park was closed for visitors. After walking around the park, it retreated into an artificial cave. One staff member eventually recaptured the lion by cutting a hole into the cave's wall and tranquilizing the animal.
1943	Berlin Zoo	Berlin	American alligator	3 years	The male Saturn escaped during a bombing raid. He was captured by British soldiers in 1946 and given to the Soviet authorities who brought him to Moscow Zoo. He died in 2020, aged 84 years.
1931	Tierpark am Karlstern	Mannheim	Lion	Less than a day	A female lion panicked and jumped out of her enclosure. She was shot before she could reach a nearby forest.

== Greece ==
Year	Zoo	Location	Species	Time loose	Notes
2022	Attica Zoological Park	Spata	Chimpanzee	20 minutes	A zoo came under scrutiny after shooting a chimpanzee that had escaped.
2018	Attica Zoological Park	Spata	Jaguar	Unknown	

== Hungary ==
Year	Zoo	Location	Species	Time loose	Notes
2026	Budapest Zoo and Botanical Garden	Budapest	Gray Langur	20 minutes	Two langurs have left their enclosure not long after being relocated to the Budapest Zoo, staying on the premises of the institute. Both the zoo, and the neighboring Biodome were evacuated for the safety of the animals until they have been safely brought back to their place.
2022	Budapest Zoo and Botanical Garden	Budapest	Penguin	Several hours	The 6-month-old male Sanyika got out of his outdoor enclosure and wandered out of the zoo until he was captured by the police the next morning.
2019	Veresegyházi Medveotthon	Veresegyház	Lion	Less than a day	The lioness Lili escaped through an open door. She went for the goat enclosure, causing panic among visitors and caretakers. She was tranquilised and brought back to her enclosure.
2015	Pécs Zoo	Pécs	Wolf	1 day	The wolf, which had been brought to the zoo two days earlier, jumped over a 2.5 m (8.2 ft) high electric fence. The zoo was evacuated until the animal was shot one day later by the zoo's director.

== Iceland ==
Year	Zoo	Location	Species	Time loose	Notes
2025	Reykjavík Family Park and Zoo	Reykjavík	Arctic fox	Several hours	The female Ylfa escaped in the night through a hole in the fence and was spotted in Laugardalur the next morning. Behind Laugardalshöll, she was cornered by five teenagers, until she was brought back to the zoo.
2015	Reykjavík Family Park and Zoo	Reykjavík	Seal	Several hours	A baby seal escaped the zoo in the night and went for a nearby campsite, where it was caught the next morning. Shortly after, the zoo announced that it would be slaughtered to feed the zoo's foxes.

== India ==
Year	Zoo	Location	Species	Time loose	Notes
2025	Alipore Zoological Garden	Kolkata	Crocodile	1 hour	Two crocodiles briefly escaped after heavy rainfall.
2025	National Zoological Park Delhi	Delhi	Golden jackal	Unknown	Four animals escaped, two were recaptured two days later.
2022	Alipore Zoological Garden	Kolkata	Chimpanzee	Unknown	In June 2022, a chimpanzee named Buri escaped her enclosure because the gate door was open while the zookeepers were feeding her. Onlookers saw that she jumped out of the cage, descended into water and swam around the moat. She returned in late noon (1 PM).
2021	Nandankanan Zoological Park	Bhubaneswar	Bengal tiger	Several hours	The male Suraj was able to break the enclosure wire as it had become weak after rusting. All visitors were evacuated and the zoo was closed. The tiger was eventually captured and brought back.
2018	Nehru Zoological Park	Hyderabad	Bengal tiger	1 day	
2016	Kamla Nehru Prani Sangrahalay	Navlakha	Bengal tiger	1.5 hours	1-year-old tigress Jamuna climbed a 12 ft high wall and crawled under the iron mesh surrounding the habitat after being scared by a balloon thrown into the enclosure.
2015	Nehru Zoological Park	Hyderabad	Bengal tiger	Brief escape	The 5-year-old Kadamba scaled a 10 ft (3 m) tall fence, before it was tranquilised and brought back to its enclosure.
2013	Nandankanan Zoological Park	Bhubaneswar	Bengal tiger	Brief escape	

== Indonesia ==
Year	Zoo	Location	Species	Time loose	Notes
2025	Lembang Park & Zoo	Sukajaya	Leopard	Unknown	
2021	Sinka Zoo	Singkawang	Sumatran tiger	1 day	Two 1-year-old tigers escaped after a landslide and killed a 47-year-old zookeeper. Nearby tourist attractions were ordered to close by police and people were told to stay at home. One tiger could be tranquilised, the other was shot after it behaved aggressively.
2017	Museum of Wildlife and Culture Zoo	Bukittinggi	Malayan tapir	Brief escape	The tapir escaped, but fell into a palace pond, where it had to be rescued.

== Ireland ==
Year	Zoo	Location	Species	Time loose	Notes
2023	Fota Wildlife Park	Fota Island	Agile gibbon	Brief escape	The male Conor made his way towards the lions and tigers before heading to the perimeter fence, but was quickly recaptured.
2023	Fota Wildlife Park	Fota Island	Black-and-white ruffed lemur	Less than a day	One female pushed through a fence and made it off her island despite getting shocked after getting into a "squabble" with two other females. She could be lured back into her enclosure.
2023	Wild Encounters Mini Zoo	Kilmeedy	Capybara	Unknown	
2022	Dublin Zoo	Dublin	Citron-crested cockatoo	Never found	
2022	Dublin Zoo	Dublin	Celebes crested macaque	Brief escape	In June, one macaque crossed the electric fence and climbed into a tree at the edge of the habitat. The animal returned to the island ten minutes later. Two months later, another monkey escaped two times on the same day. To improve the enclosure barrier, the zoo planned to install additional metal plates on both macaque houses
2022	Emerald Park	County Meath	American bison	Brief escape	Three bison escaped from their enclosure. Visitors were forced to shelter in a gift shop
2021	Emerald Park	County Meath	White stork	7 hours	
2021	Fota Wildlife Park	Fota Island	Great white pelican	Several months	One of the birds that escaped in 2018 flew to Wexford. It was later spotted in Arklow, Bull Island and Rochestown.
2021	Wild Encounters Mini Zoo	Kilmeedy	Japanese raccoon dog	Never found	Two raccoon dogs escaped on their first night in the zoo.
2020	Fota Wildlife Park	Fota Island	Great white pelican	Unknown	Two birds escaped and were spotted at the wetlands at Harper's Island.
2020	Fota Wildlife Park	Fota Island	Roloway monkey	Brief escape	The male Valentino escaped briefly at around 4.30 pm.
2018-2019	Fota Wildlife Park	Fota Island	Great white pelican	Five months	Two pelicans escaped and stayed in Wexford, 100 miles (160 km) away from the zoo. They returned on their own.
2017	Fota Wildlife Park	Fota Island	Mantled guereza	3 days	The monkey Cheeky Chops spent at least one night sleeping in a public toilet, before it could be caught and brought back into its enclosure.
2016	Fota Wildlife Park	Fota Island	Humboldt penguin	Unknown	
2016	Fota Wildlife Park	Fota Island	Lion-tailed macaque	3 days	
2015	Fota Wildlife Park	Fota Island	Humboldt penguin	1 day	The bird spent all day in the park’s lake.
2015	Fota Wildlife Park	Fota Island	Lion-tailed macaque	Less than a day	The male Stevie left his island several times on January 11 and knocked over rubbish bins. On January 12 and January 18, he and another monkey left their enclosure to raid bins.

== Japan ==
Year	Zoo	Location	Species	Time loose	Notes
2026	Horii Zoo	Moriyama, Shiga	Emu	Brief escape	
2025	Tama Zoological Park	Tokyo	Wolf	5 hours	
2017	Shibukawa Animal Park	Okayama	Aldabra giant tortoise	2 weeks	The tortoise Abuh was found only 140 metres away from her enclosure.
2016	Sendai Yagiyama Zoological Park	Sendai	Chimpanzee	2 hours	
2013	Horii Zoo	Moriyama, Shiga	Porcupine	Unknown	Three animals escaped.
2012	Tokyo Sea Life Park	Tokyo	Humboldt penguin	82 days	
2010	Horii Zoo	Moriyama, Shiga	Kangaroo	5 hours	

== Latvia ==
Year	Zoo	Location	Species	Time loose	Notes
2021	Mini Zoo Atomi	South Kurzeme Municipality	Wallaby	At least 2 weeks	The 1-year-old male Sidnejs was seen at multiple touristic places of the city such as Jūrmala Park and the beach bar Red Sun Buffet.

== Malaysia ==
Year	Zoo	Location	Species	Time loose	Notes
2024	Johor Zoo	Johor Bahru	Malayan tapir	1 day	
2020	Lok Kawi Wildlife Park	Sabah	Clouded leopard	14 hours	
2011	National Zoo of Malaysia	Ulu Kelang	Siamang	Brief escape	The gibbon attacked two children, severely injuring one.

== Mexico ==
Year	Zoo	Location	Species	Time loose	Notes
2024	Quinta La Fauna	Reynosa	Bengal tiger	5 days	The male Tony escaped and killed nearby hens and pigs. The zoo was closed until the animal was captured. The Environmental Protection Agency noted that Tony would be transferred to Tamatán Zoo.
2015	Mangrove Paradise	Coyuca de Benitez	Jaguar, lion, tiger	At least 1 month	Two tigers, a jaguar and a lion escaped from this private zoo on 26 October. In early November, all but one of the tigers were captured and taken to a zoo in Hidalgo.
2008	Bioparque Estrella	Montemorelos	Tiger	Brief escape	After the zoo had closed, the tiger left its unlocked cage and fatally attacked 26-year-old zookeeper Herminio Rodriguez Palma before being shot.
2008	Unspecified private zoo	near Acapulco	Lion	Unknown	Before it was tranquilised and captured, the lion killed two dogs and a pig and attacked a woman and child on a donkey.

== Montenegro ==
Year	Zoo	Location	Species	Time loose	Notes
2010	Unspecified private zoo	Plavnica, Lake Skadar	Hippopotamus	Unknown	Hippopotamus Nikica escaped her pen after a flooding. After the flood, she was brought back.

== Netherlands ==
Year	Zoo	Location	Species	Time loose	Notes
2026	Safaripark Beekse Bergen	Hilvarenbeek	Black crested mangabey	1 month	As of July 13, 2026, the female monkey is still not captured.
2025	Eindhoven Zoo	Eindhoven	Eurasian lynx	1 week	A 1-year-old lynx managed to make a hole in a fence and escape for one week, before it was recaptured.
2024	AquaZoo	Leeuwarden	Raccoon	More than two weeks	11 of 12 raccoons escaped on their first night in the zoo by digging their way out. More than two weeks later, five of them still were not captured.
2021	DierenPark Amersfoort	Amersfoort	Wolf	Less than a day	Two wolves escaped and roamed around in the park, before being sedated and brought back to their enclosure.
2020	DierenPark Amersfoort	Amersfoort	Chimpanzee	Less than a day	Two males escaped. The zoo was evacuated and the apes were shot.
2019	Mondo Verde	Landgraaf	Red-necked wallaby	Several hours	A pair of wallabies escaped to Kerkrade, about 2.5 miles (4 km) away, where they were captured by the police and brought back.
2017	Artis	Amsterdam	Red ruffed lemur	45 minutes	
2007	Diergaarde Blijdorp	Rotterdam	Western gorilla	Less than a day	The 11-year-old male Bokito climbed over a high stone wall and made his way through a water-filled moat. He then ran amok, dragged one woman to the ground and bit her. As Bokito approached the nearby restaurant, people hid inside and tried to barricade the door, but fled as the gorilla punched through the glass and ran in. He was tranquilized inside the restaurant and brought back to his enclosure.

== New Zealand ==
Year	Zoo	Location	Species	Time loose	Notes
2016	National Aquarium of New Zealand	Napier	Common New Zealand octopus	Never found	Inky
2014	Auckland Zoo	Auckland	Meerkat	Unknown	
2014	Orana Wildlife Park	Christchurch	Southern white rhinoceros	Unknown	Two animals got out of their enclosure after a keeper left a gate open, but only entered another enclosure.
2014	Orana Wildlife Park	Christchurch	Cheetah	10 minutes	The cub Lion could escape because of a defect of the electric fence due to flooding.
2013	Orana Wildlife Park	Christchurch	Siamang	1 hour	The male gibbon Oscar got out of the enclosure by pulling himself across the moat holding on to weeds on the bottom. His two sons joined him. They were recaptured within an hour.
2013	Pouakai Zoo	Hurworth	Spider monkey	Never found	Two monkeys escaped. One of them, Tommy, was never found and presumed dead.
2006	Auckland Zoo	Auckland	Asian small-clawed otter	Almost a month	Jin
2006	Hamilton Zoo	Hamilton	Red panda	6 days	Found dead.
2004	Auckland Zoo	Auckland	Asian elephant	Less than a day	Burma
1967	Wellington Zoo	Wellington	Tiger	1 day	The animals Napoleon and Josephine escaped when a zookeeper failed to properly close the door to their enclosure. After being spotted wandering around Newtown, they were shot dead. This action sparked public outrage.
1925	Auckland Zoo	Auckland	Leopard	27 days	Found after drowning in a harbour.

== Nigeria ==
Year	Zoo	Location	Species	Time loose	Notes
2024	Sanda Kyarimi Park Zoo	Maiduguri	Crocodile, Ostrich, Snake	Unknown	The animals escaped due to a flood.
2015	Jos Wildlife Park	Jos	Lion	1 day	The animal was shot dead by police and soldiers.

== Norway ==
Year	Zoo	Location	Species	Time loose	Notes
2024	Polar Park	Bardu Municipality	Grey Wolf	Unknown	
2020	Haugaland Zoo	Karmøy Municipality	Kangaroo	Two months	
2017	Haugaland Zoo	Karmøy Municipality	Kangaroo	One day	A female Kangaroo named Bolla escaped her enclosure when a gate was left open.

== Philippines ==
Year	Zoo	Location	Species	Time loose	Notes
2022	Argao Nature Park	Argao, Cebu	Philippine long-tailed macaque	Unknown	The monkey escaped after its cage was damaged by Typhoon Odette and later bit a motorist.
2019	Albay Park & Wildlife	Legazpi, Albay	Python	Several days	The 15 ft (4.5 m) long python called Sawa ventured into a farm and ate poultry.

== Poland ==
Year	Zoo	Location	Species	Time loose	Notes
2025	Unspecified private zoo	Gdańsk	Capybara	Less than a day	Two animals escaped.
2024	Unspecified mini zoo	Warmian–Masurian Voivodeship	Bactrian camel	Less than a day	
2023	Gdańsk Zoo	Gdańsk	Red panda	Several hours	
1939	Warsaw Zoo	Warsaw	Bear, lion	Unknown	They escaped when the zoo was bombed during the invasion of Poland.

== Romania ==
Year	Zoo	Location	Species	Time loose	Notes
2011	Sibiu Zoo	Sibiu	Tiger	Less than a day	The 14-year-old tiger escaped through an open door and jumped over the 1.8 m (5.9 ft) high perimeter fence. It was tracked down in a nearby forest and shot dead. The manager of the zoo resigned shortly after the incident.

== Serbia ==
Year	Zoo	Location	Species	Time loose	Notes
2025	Beo Zoo vrt	Belgrade	Grant's zebra	Less than a day	The zebra escaped by kicking a door open and injured three people before it was captured and brought back.
1988	Beo Zoo vrt	Belgrade	Chimpanzee	1 hour (first escape), 4 hours (second escape)	Sami
1987	Beo Zoo vrt	Belgrade	Jaguar	Less than a day	The jaguar was hindered from escaping from the zoo by the guard dog Gabi. It was shot after the police failed to capture it.

== Singapore ==
Year	Zoo	Location	Species	Time loose	Notes
2024	Singapore Zoo	Mandai	Mantled guereza	6 months	
2014	Singapore Zoo	Mandai	African wild dog	30 minutes	
2005	Night Safari	Mandai	Unspecified African cat	Brief escape	The cat escaped off the stage of an animal show and bit the foot of a Chinese tourist. After the incident, the zoo built a moat to act as a barrier between the animals and the visitors.
2005	Singapore Zoo	Mandai	Bornean orangutan	1 hour	The female Medan ran up a tree when walking back to her enclosure after a photography session. She could be lured back with food.
2005	Singapore Zoo	Mandai	Jaguar	30 minutes	The 7-year-old Angel squeezed through an opening that zookeepers used to feed it. About 500 visitors were evacuated.
2004	Singapore Zoo	Mandai	Chimpanzee	25 minutes	The 6-year-old female Ramba escaped by climbing a palm tree. Although she was shot with a tranquilizer dart, she managed her way through two animal exhibits and straight into the Upper Seletar Reservoir, where she eventually drowned.
1996	Night Safari	Mandai	Malayan tiger	25 minutes	The 1-year-old Giggo was shot dead after it escaped from its enclosure through an unlocked door. None of the visitors were hurt.
1974	Singapore Zoo	Mandai	Eland	11 days	The female antelope jumped over a 2.4 m (7.9 ft) high barbed wire fence. 18 months after her escape, she gave birth to a calf, which was believed to be the first eland born in the region.
1974	Singapore Zoo	Mandai	Hippopotamus	52 days	The male Congo is thought to be looking for its mate, Lucy, which had died three months earlier.
1973-1974	Singapore Zoo	Mandai	Black panther	11 months	The 3-year-old panther Twiggy escaped its cage just months before the zoo opened. About 200 police troopers and Singapore Armed Forces sharpshooters searched the forest area near the zoo to recapture it. Nearly a year later, the animal succumbed to injuries ensued when authorities and trackers were trying to flush it out of its hiding spot.
1973	Singapore Zoo	Mandai	Sun bear	Less than a day	Two bears squeezed through a narrow opening. One bear was recaptured immediately, while the other died after being shot 45 metres away from the cage.

== Slovakia ==
Year	Zoo	Location	Species	Time loose	Notes
2016	Bojnice Zoo	Bojnice	Brown bear	Unknown	The 6-year-old male Balú was killed after employees failed to tranquilize him.

== Slovenia ==
Year	Zoo	Location	Species	Time loose	Notes
2014	Ljubljana Zoo	Ljubljana	Carpathian lynx	At least 1 month	Two lynx escaped after their enclosure was damaged in an ice storm. The male was captured quickly. The female Zooja was captured almost a month later, but died during surgery to repair her broken thighbone.

== South Africa ==
Year	Zoo	Location	Species	Time loose	Notes
2019	Pretoria Zoo	Pretoria	Western lowland gorilla	Brief escape	17-year-old Binga escaped briefly through an unlocked door.
2003	Johannesburg Zoo	Johannesburg	Leopard	Brief escape	An injured female leopard escaped her enclosure after attacking a veterinarian. She went to the male toilet area, where she was tranquilised.
2002	Johannesburg Zoo	Johannesburg	Lion	Several hours	The lion killed two antelopes before being tranquilised the next morning.

== South Korea ==
Year	Zoo	Location	Species	Time loose	Notes
2026	Daejeon O-World	Daejeon	Wolf	9 days	The 2-year-old male Neukgu escaped.
2023	Children's Grand Park	Seoul	Plains zebra	3 hours	Following the death of his parents, a plains zebra named Sero escaped from his enclosure and wandered through the streets of Seoul. Sero was tranquillized and brought back to the zoo.
2018	Daejeon O-World	Daejeon	Cougar	4 hours	The 8-year-old female Pporongi escaped her cage, residents living near Mount Bomun were alerted to stay indoors. After failing to tranquilise the animal, it was shot in a forested area near the zoo’s dry feed storage center, which was heavily criticized by the public.

== Spain ==
Year	Zoo	Location	Species	Time loose	Notes
2024	Safari Zoo	Sa Coma	Hamadryas baboon	Unknown	A troop of baboons escaped after a branch landed on the electric fence of their enclosure. They ran around the town before being recaptured.
2015	Safari Zoo	Sa Coma	Chimpanzee	2 days	The pair Adam and Eve escaped after bending the metal bars of their cage. Eve was found in the nearby town of Son Carrio, where she was killed by rangers. Later, Adam was also killed.
2010	Cocodrilo Park	Gran Canaria	Tiger	Unknown	Three tigers escaped a zoo and were shot by police.

== Sweden ==
Year	Zoo	Location	Species	Time loose	Notes
2022	Furuvik Zoo	Furuvik	Chimpanzee	3 days	Seven chimpanzees escaped their enclosures through an unlocked lattice door. The staff opened fire on them using live ammunition, which killed four apes, among them the infant Torsten. Another one was severely injured. The decision to use lethal force rather than to attempt to use tranquilisers or otherwise recapture the apes resulted in widespread criticism.
2022	Skansen	Stockholm	King cobra	1 week	

== Switzerland ==
Year	Zoo	Location	Species	Time loose	Notes
2025	Walter Zoo	Gossau, St. Gallen	Red panda	Unknown	After a snow storm, plants in the enclosure collapsed, allowing the cubs Li and Yen to escape. Li resided alongside the vicuñas, while Yen went to the nearby forest. Both could be recaptured.
2023	Zoo Basel	Basel	Cheetah	Several minutes	The female Saada escaped through a small gap between the grid and its attachment point on the artificial rock into the neighbouring elephant enclosure. The animal was tranquilized and brought back to her enclosure.
2023	Zoo Basel	Basel	Ruffed lemur	1 day	
2019	Zürich Zoologischer Garten	Zurich	South American tapir	Less than a day	The female Oroya probably panicked because of the noises of a sewer cleaning and fled into the neighbouring bear enclosure, where it fell into a moat. She was tranquilized and brought back.
2018	Tierpark Dählhölzli	Bern	Greater flamingo	At least half an hour	A 3-year-old flamingo escaped out of the zoo and wandered through the city of Bern, before being captured by the police. The bird was not integrated into its group and its wings were not trimmed yet.
2016	Zoo Basel	Basel	Cheetah	Unknown	
2015	Tierpark Dählhölzli	Bern	Dalmatian pelican	Less than a day	A pelican without trimmed wings escaped and went to Marzilibad, a lido at the Aare, where it swam on the river together with the visitors before it was captured and brought back to its enclosure.
2014	Zoo de Servion	Servion	Syrian brown bear	Less than a day	The bear escaped through an unclosed gate and ran out of the zoo, but was quickly lured back with a trail of food.
2012	Zürich Zoologischer Garten	Zurich	Golden-bellied capuchin	Unknown	One monkey fell into a moat, where it could escape into the nearby forest.
2009	Zoo Basel	Basel	Cheetah	Unknown	Three young cheetahs escaped.
2008	Tierpark Dählhölzli	Bern	Bezoar ibex	Less than a day	A male goat jumped over the 2-metre-high electric fence and began wandering along the Aare till he was recaptured at the lido Marzilibad.
2008	Zoo Basel	Basel	Cheetah	Unknown	
2008	Zoo Basel	Basel	Reindeer	Several minutes	Shortly before Christmas, a reindeer walked out of his enclosure over the frozen moat, but quickly returned after discovering visitors.
2008	Zoo Basel	Basel	Vervet monkey	Unknown	After the group was recaptured, new electric fences were installed.
2005	Tierpark Dählhölzli	Bern	Nutria	Never found	During a flooding, three nutrias escaped. Only one of them was recaptured.
2005	Tierpark Dählhölzli	Bern	Eurasian otter	2 years	During a flooding, the otter pair Lumpi and Orava escaped and settled at the Aare between Bern and Münsingen. Shortly after, Orava gave birth to three pups. In 2007, the pair was captured, as well as one of the pups. The other pups were never found.
2000	Zoo Basel	Basel	Ring-tailed lemur	Unknown	
1999	Tierpark Dählhölzli	Bern	Eurasian beaver	Never captured	A pair of beavers escaped the zoo and settled at the Aare between Münsingen and Lake Wohlen.
1987	Zoo Basel	Basel	Chimpanzee	Several hours	Five chimps escaped out of their enclosure, but stayed in the ape house. When trying to tranquilize the male Eros, he broke through the glass roof. After several hours, four apes could be tranquilized and recaptured. The 6-year-old male Dan tried to escape again and attacked a policeman, who shot him.
1936	Zürich Zoologischer Garten	Zurich	Leopard	Unknown	The animal didn't survive its escape.
1933	Zürich Zoologischer Garten	Zurich	Black panther	Several weeks or months	It is unknown how the animal could escape. It roamed free through Eastern Switzerland until it was shot by two poachers, who turned its meat into sausages. The two received a fine, which was offset by the reward for killing the panther.

== Thailand ==
Year	Zoo	Location	Species	Time loose	Notes
2024	Chiang Mai Zoo	Chiang Mai	Red kangaroo	1 day	The 2-year-old animal was hopping uphill on a road towards the Doi Suthep mountain. It was found dead the next day.

== Turkey ==
Year	Zoo	Location	Species	Time loose	Notes
2025	Land of Lions	Manavgat	Lion	Several hours	The male Zeus escaped its cage and injured a farmer before being shot by hunters in a nearby forest.

== Ukraine ==
Year	Zoo	Location	Species	Time loose	Notes
2023	Kazkova Dibrova	Nova Kakhovka	duck, swan	Unknown	They escaped after the destruction of the Kakhovka Dam.
2022	Kharkiv Zoo	Kharkiv	Chimpanzee	2 hours	The 13-year-old female Chichi was wheeled back to its enclosure on a bike.
2022	Kharkiv Zoo	Kharkiv	Lion, Monkey, Red wolf, Indian porcupine, Raccoon	Never found	They escaped during the battle of Kharkiv. Every animal except for the red wolves could be recaptured.

== United Kingdom ==
Year	Zoo	Location	Species	Time loose	Notes
2026	Highland Wildlife Park	Kingussie, Scotland	Japanese macaque	1 day	5-year-old Luka escaped overnight and managed to get bacl into his enclosure by himself.
2026	Marwell Zoo	Hampshire, England	Capybara	8 days	Samba and Tango escaped one day after arriving at the zoo. While Tango was found quickly, Samba remains on the run. People in the area around the zoo took the incident with humor, generating AI images of the rodent.
2025	Curraghs Wildlife Park	Isle of Man	Yellow mongoose	Unknown	
2025	Jersey Zoo	Jersey	Capybara	2.5 hours	The zoo closed temporarily after the 2-year-old Tango escaped.
2025	Wildwood Devon	Devon, England	Eurasian brown bear	Brief escape	The two young bears Mish and Lucy escaped their enclosure and raided a honey store. The park was evacuated and the bears were monitored by staff, before Lucy was lured back and Mish returned by itself.
2024	Colchester Zoo	Essex, England	Rainbow lorikeet	Never found	The bird escaped after landing on a guest who exited the curtained aviary. To encourage its return, the remaining lorikeets were moved into their outdoor enclosure and food was left overnight, but the bird never returned.
2024	Dartmoor Zoological Park	Devon, England	Palawan binturong	19 days	
2024	Amazon World Zoo Park	Isle of Wight, England	Raccoon	7 days	Four raccoons escaped, with the last being captured seven days later.
2024	Hoo Zoo	Shropshire, England	Capybara	1 week	
2024	Highland Wildlife Park	Kingussie, Scotland	Japanese macaque	5 days	The macaque, named Honshu, escaped and survived in the wild for five days before being captured after being found eating from a bird feeder two miles away in Kincraig.
2024	London Zoo	London, England	Blue-throated macaw	6 days	The two females Lily and Margot did not return to their enclosure after their usual routine of flying freely. Six days later, they were found 60 miles away behind a family’s garden in Cambridgeshire.
2023	Blackpool Zoo	Lancashire, England	Great white pelican	19 days	The 17-week-old bird went missing after being scared by seagulls. 19 days later, it was captured in Knaresborough, 73.5 miles (118 km) away from the zoo.
2023	Newquay Zoo	Cornwall, England	Red panda	One day	
2023	Pet Encounter Cumbria	Cumbria, England	Tegu	2 weeks	Echo escaped after digging her way out of an enclosure. Two weeks later, she was found in the backyard.
2023	Wild Zoological Park	Staffordshire, England	Yellow parrot	Unknown	The birds were knocked off the zoo's area by a gust of wind.
2022	Tiny Steps Petting Farm	Lincolnshire, England	Wallaby	18 days	
2021	Waulkmill Menagierie Petting Farm	Aberdeenshire, Scotland	Wallaby	Unknown	The 6-month-old Eddie escaped on his first day in the zoo. He was spotted one mile (1.6 km) away from the zoo outside a pub in New Deer.
2021	Whipsnade Zoo	Bedfordshire, England	Brown bear	Less than a day	A falling tree damaged a fence, allowing two female bears to cross into the neighbouring enclosure, where they attacked a male boar. They were shot by zookeepers.
2020	Curraghs Wildlife Park	Isle of Man	Red panda	3 days	The 7-year-old Kush escaped.
2020	Johnsons Zoological Gardens	Cambridgeshire, England	Wallaby	Unknown	The wallaby was captured by the police in St. Ives, almost six miles (9.65 km) away from the zoo.
2019	Belfast Zoo	Belfast, Northern Ireland	Chimpanzee	Brief escape	Several chimps used a branch to climb up a wall.
2019	Belfast Zoo	Belfast, Northern Ireland	Red panda	1 day	
2019	Curraghs Wildlife Park	Isle of Man	Red panda	3 weeks	The 7-year-old Kush escaped after a tree fell across his enclosure. He was spotted a mile (1.6 km) away from the zoo in garden.
2019	Exmoor Zoo	Devon, England	Pink-backed pelican	Unknown	The 3-year-old bird escaped while workers were cutting the feathers of its flock.
2018	Belfast Zoo	Belfast, Northern Ireland	Colombian spider monkey	Several hours	The monkey died after being hit by a car on the M2 motorway.
2018	Dudley Zoo	West Midlands, England	Snow leopard	Less than a day	8-year-old Margaash shot dead after a zookeeper left the enclosure door open and it escaped. At this time, the zoo was already closed.
2018	Five Sisters Zoo	West Lothian, Scotland	African sacred ibis	3 days	The 3-year-old bird was caught six miles (9.65 km) away in Whitehill Industrial Estate in Bathgate.
2018	Tropiquaria	Somerset, England	South American tapir	Several hours	
2018	Unspecified private zoo	Cornwall, England	Clouded leopard	1 week	The animal hunted sheep until it was caught in a farmer's fox trap.
2017	Borth Animalarium	Borth, Wales	Eurasian lynx	13 days	1-year-old female Lilith climbed a spindly sapling growing in her enclosure and jumped over the fences. She was killed by marksmen in a caravan park in Aberystwyth.
2017	Chester Zoo	Cheshire, England	Sumatran orangutan	Brief escape	The 8-year-old female Indah escaped her enclosure and went into a staff area.
2016	Chester Zoo	Cheshire, England	Sumatran orangutan	Brief escape	The four apes Subis, Indah, Tuti and Siska escaped during a time when the Monsoon Forest building was not open for visitors.
2016	Dartmoor Zoological Park	Dartmoor, England	Carpathian lynx	3 weeks	The 2-year-old male Flaviu escaped one day after arriving from Port Lympne Wild Animal Park. Children at the nearby Little Orchard Montessori School were told to stay inside earlier. Until he was captured three weeks later, the young lynx killed four lambs.
2016	London Zoo	London, England	Western lowland gorilla	Brief escape	After a door was left unsecured during feeding time, the male Kumbuka made his escape but only made it as far as a storage area, where he drank five litres of undiluted squash before being tranquilised and brought back to his enclosure.
2016	Paignton Zoo	Devon, England	Lechwe	2 hours	The escape was triggered by fights between the males in the zoo's herd. After it was tranquilized and recaptured in a garden in Paignton, it was put down.
2015	Belfast Zoo	Belfast, Northern Ireland	Lion-tailed macaque	3 days (1st escape), brief escape (2nd escape)	In March, the two monkeys Zoid and Rose escaped. Rose was captured one day later at Cave Hill, Zoid was captured three days after its escape near houses in Ben Madigan Park in northern Belfast. One month later, another animal escaped for a brief period, before it was also recaptured.
2014	Tropiquaria	Somerset, England	Raccoon	Unknown	The female Missy escaped by digging a tunnel through the ground which was softened due to a recent flooding.
2013	Belfast Zoo	Belfast, Northern Ireland	Lion-tailed macaque	1 week	Six monkeys escaped.
2013	Colchester Zoo	Essex, England	Timber wolf	8 hours	Five wolves escaped through a damaged fence. Three of them were shot dead.
2010	Belfast Zoo	Belfast, Northern Ireland	White-nosed coati	Five weeks	
2009	Chester Zoo	Cheshire, England	Chimpanzee	3 hours	30 chimps escaped their enclosure at lunchtime and went to a food preparation area. The zoo was evacuated. After they had eaten, they could be brought back.
2008	Belfast Zoo	Belfast, Northern Ireland	Prairie dog	Unknown	
2008	Belfast Zoo	Belfast, Northern Ireland	Ring-tailed lemur	Unknown	The lemur was found dead 1.5 miles away from the zoo on Hightown Road.
2008	Hamerton Zoo Park	Cambridgeshire, England	Cheetah	Unknown	The 3-year-old animal escaped through a defective fence and was later found by a 9-year-old boy in his back garden.
2007	Dartmoor Zoological Park	Dartmoor, England	Wolf	Less than a day	
2006	Belfast Zoo	Belfast, Northern Ireland	Bongo	Unknown	After a dog attack, two animals jumped over the fence of their enclosure.
2006	Dartmoor Zoological Park	Dartmoor, England	Jaguar	Less than a day	The animal escaped into the tiger enclosure before it was sedated.
2005	Birmingham Wildlife Conservation Park	Birmingham, England	Red panda	Less than a day, 4 days	Believed to have been blown out of a tree or leapt to another. Initially escaped and recaptured the same day, then escaped again a few days later. Netted after being found in a tree.
2005	Belfast Zoo	Belfast, Northern Ireland	Chimpanzee	Several minutes	9-year-old Phoebe escaped together with two other chimps by using a log to climb out of the enclosure. They put their hands up and returned after the police fired warning shots into the air.
2005	Belfast Zoo	Belfast, Northern Ireland	Eastern black-and-white colobus	1 week	The young male Mojo fled after an argument with his father and returned one week later. After his return, it was decided to ship him and his brothers off to South Africa's Induna Primate and Parrot Park.
2003	Chester Zoo	Cheshire, England	Orangutan	90 minutes	The ape sat on the roof of its enclosure until he went back in to sleep.
1997	South Lakes Safari Zoo	Cumbria, England	White rhinoceros	Brief escape	The animal fell down a ravine and had to be shot.
1996	Chester Zoo	Cheshire, England	Chimpanzee	Less than a day	A 30-year-old ape escaped and attacked a zookeeper. It was shot after tranquilisation failed.
1975	Chester Zoo	Cheshire, England	Asian elephant	Less than a day	The bull Nobby broke through the perimeter fence while in his musth. He was shot dead in a nearby residential area after employees failed to tranquilise him.
1965	London Zoo	London, England	Golden eagle	17 days	The escape of the male Goldie caused a nationwide sensation. Ten months later, he escaped again for five days.
1957	Glasgow Zoo	Lanarkshire, Scotland	Red deer	Unknown	The deer Bambi was later recaptured after being found more than 1.5 miles (1 km) away.
1951	Glasgow Zoo	Lanarkshire, Scotland	Raccoon	Never found	
1949	Glasgow Zoo	Lanarkshire, Scotland	Bengal tiger	Less than a day	The tigress Sheila was shot dead after nearly killing a zookeeper.
1948	Glasgow Zoo	Lanarkshire, Scotland	Asian elephant, camel	Less than a day	The female Freda bursted out of the elephant house and released a camel from the neighbouring enclosure.
1947	Glasgow Zoo	Lanarkshire, Scotland	Kangaroo	Unknown	Two kangaroos escaped. One wandered through the zoo, the other was found at a field in Mount Vernon.
1940	London Zoo	London, England	Zebra, Wild ass	Unknown	They escaped during a bomb raid. While the zebra was later found, it is unknown what happened to the ass.
1904-1905	Unspecified zoo	Northumberland, England	Wolf	2 months	Hexham wolf

== United States ==
Year	Zoo	Location	Species	Time loose	Notes
2026	Greenville Zoo	Greenville, South Carolina	Leopard	Brief escape	4-year-old Irina briefly escaped through an open door before the zoo was opened to the public.
2026	Point Defiance Zoo & Aquarium	Tacoma, Washington	Clouded leopard	3 hours	
2025	Brookfield Zoo Chicago	Brookfield, Illinois	Nyala	Brief escape	
2025	Cedar Point	Sandusky, Ohio	Alpaca	Unknown	Three alpacas escaped from The Barnyard during a routine cleaning.
2025	G&G Animals	Oswego, New York	Wallaby	11 days	The female wallaby Mac escaped.
2025	Indianapolis Zoo	Indianapolis, Indiana	Chimpanzee	Brief escape	The 34-year-old female Mara escaped her enclosure around 10 a.m., forcing 37 guests to take shelter inside the dolphin exhibit.
2025	Living Desert Zoo and Gardens	Palm Desert, California	Bat-eared fox	Unknown	
2025	New Zoo Adventure Park	Suamico, Wisconsin	North American river otter	Never found	During a snowstorm the pair Louie and Ophelia escaped through a hole in a fence. One month later Ophelia was captured. After Louie evaded capture several times, the search for him was concluded.
2025	Reid Park Zoo	Tucson, Arizona	Reticulated giraffe	Brief escape	Three-year-old giraffe named Msituni (see-TOO-nee) escaped briefly and was found nearby her enclosure munching on mesquite tree leaves. She came back into her enclosure on her own, under the supervision of the zoo's animal care and veterinary teams.
2025	Turtle Back Zoo	West Orange, New Jersey	American black bear	Brief escape	The 20-year-old female Jelly briefly escaped into an area not open to the public before the zoo opened.
2025	Zootastic Park	Troutman, North Carolina	Capuchin monkey	6 days	The monkey escaped by pulling the wire bars apart and sliding through them. About a week later, it was killed by a vehicle.
2024	Cedar Point	Sandusky, Ohio	Dromedary, goat	Brief escape	One June 11, two camels escaped. Four days later, 15 goats were released from their enclosure.
2023-2024	Central Park Zoo	New York City	Eurasian eagle-owl	1 year	Flaco escaped from his enclosure, living in Central Park for a year drawing much attention and eluding attempts at being captured.
2023	Central Park Zoo	New York City	California sea lion	Less than a day	Sally the sea lion escaped during a flooding, but was monitored by employees and returned to her enclosure by herself.
2023	Dallas Zoo	Dallas, Texas	Clouded leopard	Several hours	A clouded leopard named Nova was intentionally let out of her enclosure by a man named Davion Irvin, who also killed a vulture at the zoo and stole two monkeys.
2023	Omaha's Henry Doorly Zoo and Aquarium	Omaha, Nebraska	Cheetah	Brief escape	A 5-year-old female Cheetah named Gretchen escaped; the zoo was immediately closed, and guests and staff members were directed to secure indoor locations.
2023	Saint Louis Zoo	St. Louis, Missouri	Spectacled bear	2 hours (in total)	The 4-year-old male Ben escaped in early February by meddling with the steel mesh of his outdoor enclosure, he was captured after one hour and a half. The same month, he escaped again for 50 minutes.
2022	Cleveland Metroparks Zoo	Cleveland, Ohio	Mexican wolf	Brief escape	
2022	Jacksonville Zoo and Gardens	Jacksonville, Florida	Black bear	Under an hour	A black bear was shot after escaping its enclosure and attacking a zoo keeper.
2022	Memphis Zoo	Memphis, Tennessee	Wallaby	2 days	
2021	It's A Zoo Life	Macclesfield, North Carolina	Serval	Brief escape	The owner of the zoo said that a pig released the serval.
2021	Minnesota Zoo	Apple Valley, Minnesota	Eurasian eagle-owl	14 days	Gladys
2020	Greenville Zoo	Greenville, South Carolina	Leopard	Brief escape	The 5-month-old cub Anastasia escaped briefly before it was captured with a net.
2018	Audubon Zoo	New Orleans, Louisiana	Jaguar	1 hour, 35 minutes	A jaguar named Valerio managed to escape his enclosure, entering other enclosures in the zoo and killed four alpacas, one emu, and one fox. The jaguar was tranquillized and was not harmed.
2018	Greenville Zoo	Greenville, South Carolina	Sumatran orangutan	20 minutes	The 12-year-old male Kumar escaped briefly while a contractor was replacing mesh panels
2017	Greenville Zoo	Greenville, South Carolina	Sumatran orangutan	Brief escape	The 12-year-old male Kumar escaped briefly.
2017	Smithsonian National Zoo	Washington, D.C.	Bobcat	2 days	
2016	Binder Park Zoo	Battle Creek, Michigan	Waterbuck	2 hours	
2015	Memphis Zoo	Memphis, Tennessee	Celebes crested macaque	2 days	A tiny macaque called Zimm escaped her enclosure by climbing a wall. Two days later, she was found inside a drainage system. Zimm's escape resulted in a Twitter account that racked up more than 1,500 followers.
2014	Como Zoo	Saint Paul, Minnesota	Western lowland gorilla	50 minutes	The three male gorillas Virgil, Sampson and Jabir escaped briefly, visitors were brought into secure areas.
2013	Smithsonian National Zoo	Washington, D.C.	Red panda	1 day	Rusty the red panda escaped from his enclosure around 7:30 am. He was found in the Adams Morgan neighbourhood and rescued from a tree by the local humane society.
2011	Bronx Zoo	New York City	Egyptian cobra	6 days	An Egyptian cobra managed to elude zoo keepers and survive nearly a week outside of its enclosure at the Bronx Zoo.
2011	Los Angeles Zoo	Los Angeles, California	Bornean orangutan	Brief escape	The 6-year-old female Berani escaped through a hole before she was sedated by zookeepers.
2011	Minnesota Zoo	Apple Valley, Minnesota	Mexican wolf	Brief escape	An 8-year-old male wolf escaped his enclosure through a hole in the fence. To keep visitors safe, the animal was shot.
2011	Muskingum County Animal Farm	Zanesville, Ohio	Bengal tiger, black bear, grizzly bear, wolf, macaque, baboon, cougar, lion	1 night	See 2011 Zanesville, Ohio animal escape
2008	Honolulu Zoo	Honolulu, Hawaii	Sumatran tiger	Brief escape	The 8-year-old male Berani escaped briefly through an open door before being lured back into his enclosure.
2007	San Francisco Zoo	San Francisco, California	Siberian tiger	One night	See San Francisco Zoo tiger attacks
2006	Utah's Hogle Zoo	Salt Lake City, Utah	Wolf	1.5 hours	The 8-year-old female Maddi jumped over a barbed wire fence. The zoo was evacuated and temporarily closed.
2005	Sedgwick County Zoo	Wichita, Kansas	Lesser flamingo	17 years	Two flamingos, Flamingo 492 and 347, escaped their enclosure during a storm. One of the flamingos was last seen in Minnesota, while the other was last seen in 2022 in Port Lavaca, Texas.
2004	Binder Park Zoo	Battle Creek, Michigan	Mexican wolf	2 months	The wolf was hit by a train in Vicksburg.
2000	Los Angeles Zoo	Los Angeles, California	Western lowland gorilla	Unknown	The 24-year-old female Evelyn took advantage of the zoo’s need for a renovation and escaped her enclosure four or five times.
1997	JungleLand Zoo	Kissimmee, Florida	Lion	2 days	The lioness Nala (named after the fictional character from The Lion King) escaped after being scared by the noises of the installment of a platform. She was tranquilised two days later by a vet.
1997	Oakland Zoo	Oakland, California	American bison	Half an hour	
1994	Como Park Zoo and Conservatory	Saint Paul, Minnesota	Western lowland gorilla	45 minutes	The male Casey escaped by climbing a 15 ft (4.5 m) tall concrete wall.
1987	Tracy Aviary	Salt Lake City, Utah	Chilean flamingo	18 years	See Pink Floyd the flamingo
1986	Los Angeles Zoo	Los Angeles, California	Western lowland gorilla	Unknown	The 10-year-old female Evelyn jumped on the back of another gorilla to jump over a 12 ft (3.65 m) tall wall.
1985-1987	San Diego Zoo	San Diego, California	Bornean orang-utan	Usually under an hour	The orang-utan Ken Allen escaped his enclosure nine times.
1982	Lincoln Park Zoo	Chicago, Illinois	Western lowland gorilla	15 minutes	The silverback Otto escaped and wandered between the Lion House and the Reptile House. After a vet tranquilised him, he climbed on top of the Crown Field Center before falling into some bushes.
1979	Los Angeles Zoo	Los Angeles, California	Wolf	Unknown	The female Virginia escaped several times by climbing trees and fences.
1964	Lincoln Park Zoo	Chicago, Illinois	Western lowland gorilla	Brief escape	The silverback Sinbad escaped his cage, but was tranquilised before getting out of the Ape House.
1964	San Francisco Zoo	San Francisco, California	Agouti, American bison, pygmy hippopotamus	Less than a day	
1957	Bronx Zoo	New York City	Platypus	Never found	Penelope
1954	Fort Worth Zoo	Fort Worth, Texas	Python	15 days	A female called Pete (later renamed to Patricia) escaped through a faulty door. Nearby residents wouldn't let their children out of the house, a $500 bounty was put up and the search for the reptile captured the nation's attention.
1935	Frank Buck’s Jungle Camp	Massapequa, New York	Rhesus macaque	Several days	Led by a male called Al Capone, 175 of the 500 monkeys escaped from their enclosure, supposedly after an employee left a wooden plank over the moat that normally kept them in. Over the next days, the macaques wreaked havoc in Long Island.
1934	Frank Buck's Jungle Camp	Century of Progress, Chicago, Illinois	Rhesus macaque	Unknown	At least two animals escaped and smashed up the exhibit of a pottery company.
1916	Bronx Zoo	New York City	Ring-tailed cat	2 months	The ring-tailed cat Loco escaped and feasted on the zoo's bird collection before being caught two months later.
1908	Bronx Zoo	New York City	Cuban iguana, Indian python	Brief escape	Two iguanas escaped their confines, which caused panic among the visitors. They were thrown into burlap sacks and returned to their confines. In the same year, an Indian python escaped briefly.
1905	Bronx Zoo	New York City	Snow leopard	1 day	The mate of the one that escaped 1904. It was caught in the night after it escaped.
1904	Bronx Zoo	New York City	Snow leopard	1 day	A snow leopard managed to escape Bronx Zoo before being shot.
1903	Lincoln Park Zoo	Chicago, Illinois	California sea lion	At least one year	The male Big Ben destroyed two fences and escaped into the outer lagoon. He wasn't captured for several years and spotted in Racine, Wisconsin, St. Joseph, Michigan and Muscatine, Iowa. In 1904, it was reported that his remains had been found near Bridgman, Michigan, although fishermen from Galveston, Texas claimed that they caught him in 1910.
1902	Bronx Zoo	New York City	Jaguar	Never found	A black panther crashed a picnic and is said to have eaten the sandwiches and the ham, which led to panic among the zoo's visitors. It eventually jumped into the Bronx River and swam away.
1901	Bronx Zoo	New York City	Bear	Unknown	
1897	Lincoln Park Zoo	Chicago, Illinois	Spotted hyena	1 week	A male named Jim escaped to Graceland Cemetery and was not caught for a week, until it was shot by two employees at a strawberry patch in Forest Park. During the escape, children in Edgewater and Rogers Park had to stay inside.
1892	Lincoln Park Zoo	Chicago, Illinois	Asian elephant	Less than a day	The female Duchess escaped while being brought to her day quarters. She ran to Webster Avenue, smashed the double doors of the Bartholomae & Leicht brewery and tripped over a barrel of beer in a nearby saloon. Eventually, she was tied between two trees and brought back.
1889	Lincoln Park Zoo	Chicago, Illinois	Sea lion	Never captured	All 18 sea lions escaped and wandered to Clark Street. All but one were captured.
1880	Lincoln Park Zoo	Chicago, Illinois	Sea lion	Less than a day	Two sea lions hopped a fence. One was lured back with fish, the other returned by itself.

== Vietnam ==
Year	Zoo	Location	Species	Time loose	Notes
2024	Unknown zoo	Thang Binh District	Asian elephant	4.5 hours	
