= Washford transmitting station =

Transmitter station in Somerset, England

Washford
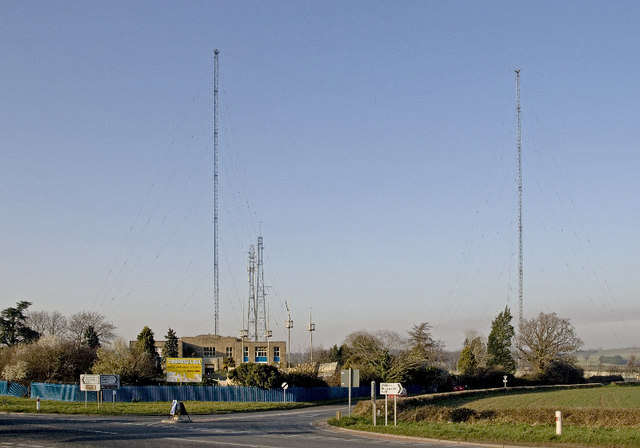
- Washford transmitting station masts

- Location: Washford, Somerset
- Mast height: 152 metres (499 ft) (MW); 45.7 metres (150 ft) (UHF)
- Coordinates: 51°09′38″N 3°20′55″W
- Grid reference: ST058410
- Built: 1933
- Relay of: Mendip
- BBC region: BBC West
- ITV region: ITV West Country

Listed Building – Grade II
- Official name: Washford Transmitting Station
- Designated: 25 January 1984
- Reference no.: 1057461

Washford transmitting station is a medium wave broadcasting station and low-power digital terrestrial television relay near Washford, Somerset.

A smaller 45.7 metres (150 ft) mast is used to relay digital terrestrial television services from the Mendip transmitting station. This mast carries the three public service multiplexes at an E.R.P. of 12.4 W.

The front portions of the old transmitter building are now part of the Tropiquaria wildlife park and house their tropical hall, aquarium, and nocturnal house. The majority of the old building became surplus to the BBC's requirements in 1981 when new, smaller equipment was installed in a separate building to the rear. Two schemes subsequently failed to materialise for the old building: one to transform it into a public swimming pool and another to replace it with a Little Chef restaurant. In 1987, a £100,000 scheme to transform the site into an aquarium and reptile house was proposed by the consortium Ark Enterprises Ltd, headed by Stephen Smith. Both a 21-year lease on the building and planning permission were acquired in 1987, and Tropiquaria opened in 1989.

The transmitter building is a Grade II listed building.

== History ==
It was built in 1933 and uses a T-antenna between two 152 metres (499 ft) tall guyed masts separated by a distance of 159 metres (174 yards). Originally the station used cage antennas around each mast. The station uses the frequencies 882 kHz with 10 kW, and 1089 kHz with 80 kW

It was also known as Watchet. It would be near Washford Cross. The BBC West region was in Cardiff.

It cost £150,000.

=== Construction ===
On Friday 10 June 1932 a 50 ft girder collapsed and three men were crushed, Joe Willie Rowbottom, a rigger, died in hospital at 7pm on Saturday 11 June 1932. The other injured men were Leonard Bruce and Benjamin Bryne.

=== Transmission ===
Transmission tests would begin on Monday 24 April 1933. The West Regional transmitter opened on 9 May 1933. Transmission tests on the national programme started on Monday 17 July 1933.

== Services available ==
=== Analogue radio (AM medium wave) ===
Frequency	kW	Service
882 kHz	10	BBC Radio Wales
1089 kHz	80	Talksport

=== Digital television ===
Digital television began transmitting from Washford during the digital switchover in 2010. As a low-power relay, it only carries the three public service multiplexes.

Frequency	UHF	kW	Operator	System
546.000 MHz	30	0.0124	BBC A	DVB-T
554.000 MHz	31	0.0124	Digital 3&4	DVB-T
602.000 MHz	37	0.0124	BBC B	DVB-T2

=== Analogue television ===
Analogue television was transmitted from Washford until the digital switchover of the Mendip transmitter group between 24 March - 7 April 2010.

Frequency	UHF	kW	Service
615.25 MHz	39	0.062	HTV West
695.25 MHz	49	0.062	BBC1 West
831.25 MHz	66	0.062	BBC2 West
847.25 MHz	68	0.062	Channel 4
