= Pécs Zoo =

Pécs Zoo & Aquarium-Terrarium
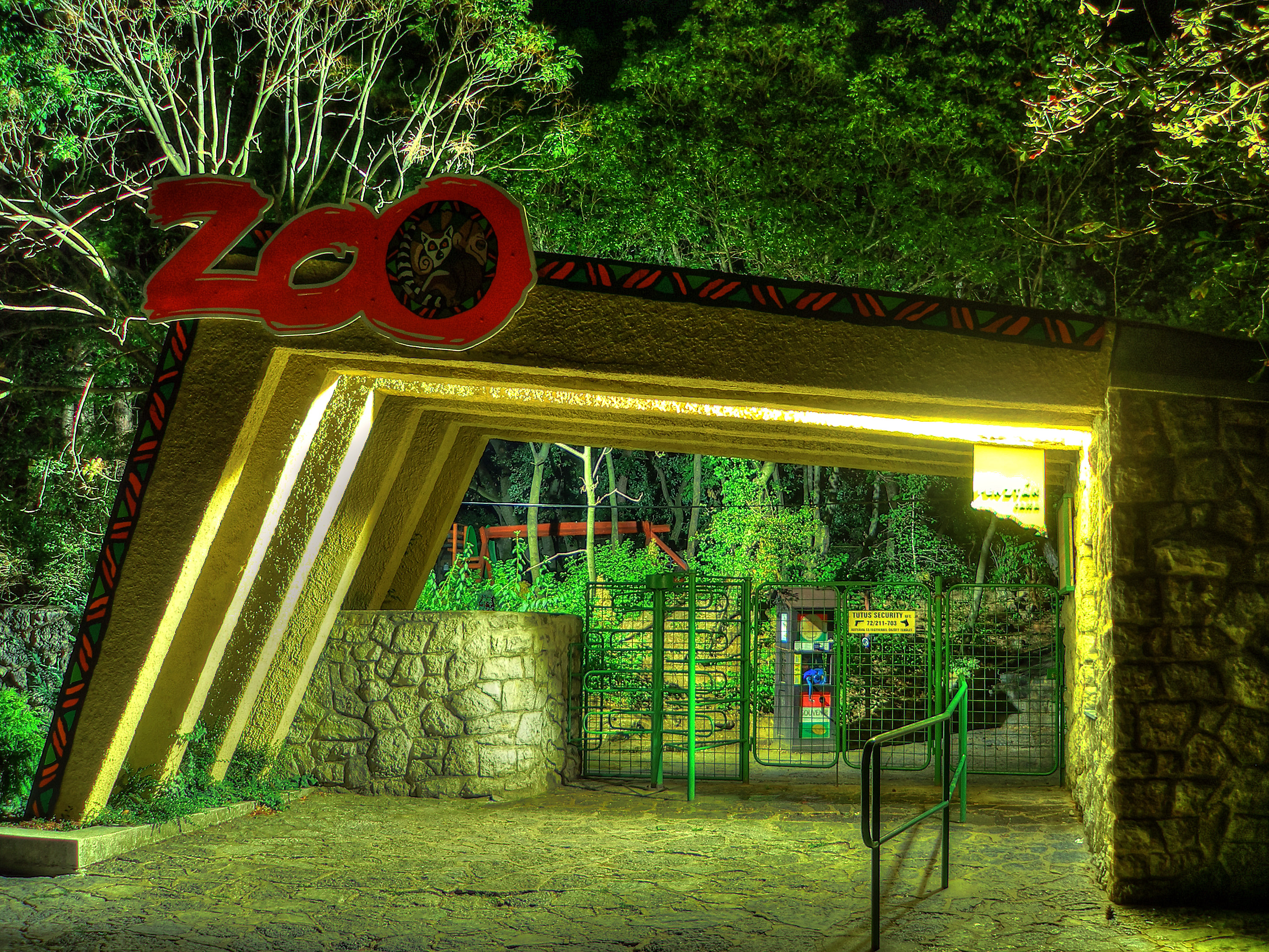
- Pécs Zoo entrance in 2007
- Interactive map of Pécs Zoo & Aquarium-Terrarium
- 46°5′37.68″N 18°13′36.84″E
- Date opened: Zoo: 19 August 1960; Aquarium-Terrarium: 22 August 1985
- Location: Pécs, Hungary
- Land area: 3.5 ha
- No. of animals: 1037
- No. of species: 199
- Annual visitors: 100,000
- Major exhibits: ISIS
- Website: www.pecszoo.hu

Pécs Zoo & Aquarium-Terrarium (Hungarian: Pécsi Állatkert és Akvárium-Terrárium) is one of the smallest Hungarian zoos. It was established in 1960 in the Mecsek mountain above the city, and was originally known as Mecsek Cultural Park. A now-closed amusement park, established in 1961 was also on the site, linked to the zoo by a 570 m light railway.

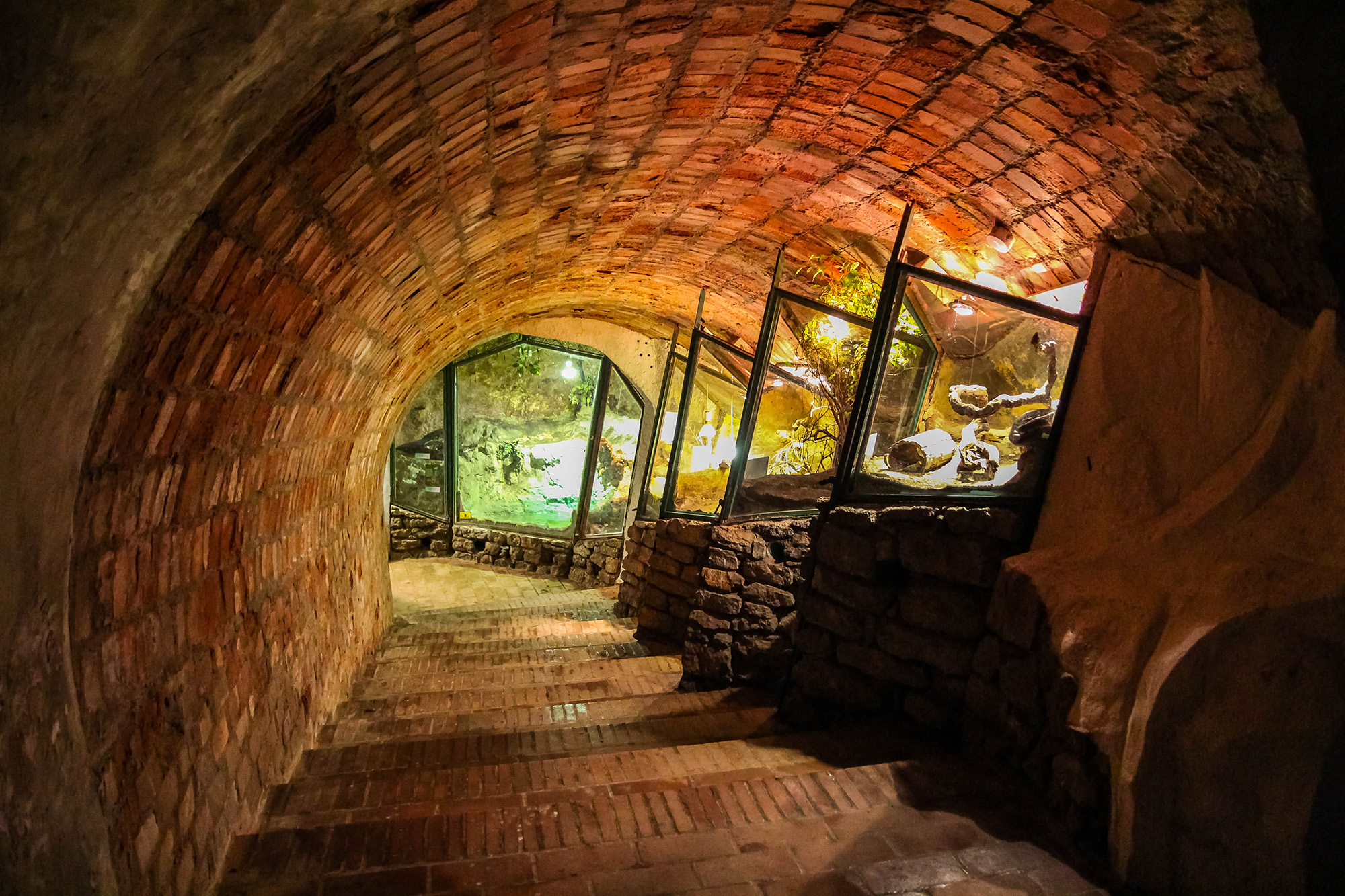
Aquarium-Terrarium in 2015

The aquarium-terrarium is separate from the zoo, in the inner city located within the mediaeval cellar system. It was built in 1985, to celebrate the 25th anniversary of the zoo.

The zoo has approximately 100,000 visitors annually.

== History ==
=== History of the zoo ===
The zoo was built in 1959–1961, with labour contributed by high school and university students, as well as other labourers of various types through the socialist voluntary labour scheme. (It took altogether 45,367 labour hours according to the memorial plaque near the entrance. The construction started in April 1959, and had been finished in 1961, although the zoo phase had been opened on 19 August 1960.) The location was chosen to locate the zoo within the natural surroundings of the Mecsek hills, outside the urban landscape.

Originally, there were a tiny terrarium and aquarium, and also cougars, lions, tigers, leopard, black panther, Eurasian lynx, bears, and wolves as well. Later, the aquarium and the terrarium moved to the city, and because of the tiny cages, many animals had to be moved to other zoos (in the early 2000s the lions' cages have been renovated, and the lynxes stayed only).

Besides the obsolete circumstances, the zoo endangered the water system for the city, so in the 2000s, there were a number of plans to move or close the zoo.

The area of the zoo is 3.5 ha, and it is not considered large enough to have many bigger animals. In 2012, there were 250 animals of 57 species, including lions, monkeys, kangaroos, camels, hippopotamuses, deer, antelopes, zebras, and Falabella miniature horses.

=== History of the Aquarium-Terrarium ===
The Aquarium-Terrarium was opened to celebrate the 25th anniversary of the zoo. It was placed in the mediaeval cellar system, where a year-round tropical atmosphere (25–27 °C (77–81 °F) temperature and high humidity) can be created.

The cellar is at Munkácsy street No 31, 10 metres below the home of Mihály Munkácsy. The 800 m^{2} large cellar was designed by Sándor Dévényi. Its system contained 27 terrariums and 5 larger, 31 smaller aquariums with approximately 800 animals of 138 species.

The Aquarium-Terrarium closed on 28 March 2016, followed by the relocation of the animals to the zoo the following day. The utilization of the building is unknown.

== Reconstruction ==
The 50-year-old zoo was in very poor condition. Some old cages did not meet the standards of the 21st century, and the zoo spoiled the catchment area, so there were plans to move the zoo to Árpádtető (near MecsExtrém Park) or Kökény (as a Safari Park), but for financial reasons the move never happened. The zoo had always a licence from one year to the next, and the closure was also a plan. Finally, reconstruction started in May 2014 (which costs 1.2 billion forint); since then the zoo had been closed until spring 2016. After the reconstruction, the zoo became larger, the aquarium-terrarium also moved here, and new, larger animals can have home here. A monitor lizard, Varanus salvadorii moved to the terrarium in late 2014. A cougar will come from Athens, and a 100,000 liter aquarium took place in the new zoo from 2016. Planned new animals: seals, tigers, brown bears, leopard, zebra shark, requiem sharks.

The zoo re-opened finally on 20 May 2016.
