= Lovech Zoo =

Zoo located in Lovech, Bulgaria

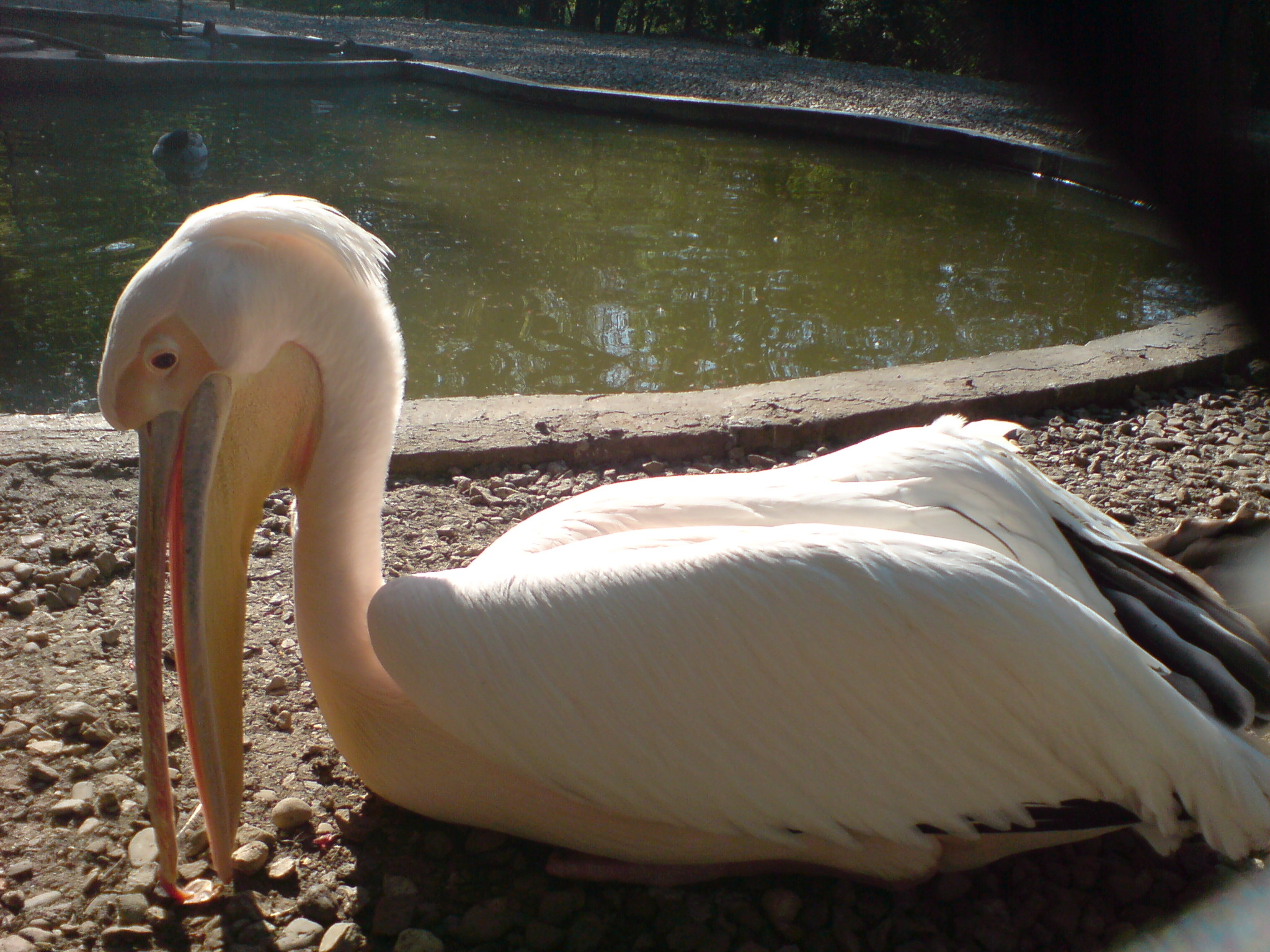
- Interactive map of Lovech Zoo
- 43.1385416°N 24.7275531°E
- Location: Lovech, Bulgaria

Lovech Zoo is a zoo located in Stratesh Park in Lovech, (international transliteration Loveč) is a city in north-central Bulgaria.

== Incidents ==
On August 3, 2014, a jaguar escaped from its cage at the zoo in the northern Bulgarian city of Lovech, after a zoo keeper left the doors open. The jaguar was shot dead the next day.
