= Greenville Zoo =

Zoological park in South Carolina, U.S.

- Interactive map of Greenville Zoo
- 34.8474°N 82.3871°W
- Date opened: 1960
- Location: Greenville, South Carolina, United States
- Land area: 14 acres (5.7 ha)
- Annual visitors: 325,000
- Website: www.greenvillezoo.com

The Greenville Zoo is a zoo in Greenville, South Carolina, which opened in 1960.

== History ==
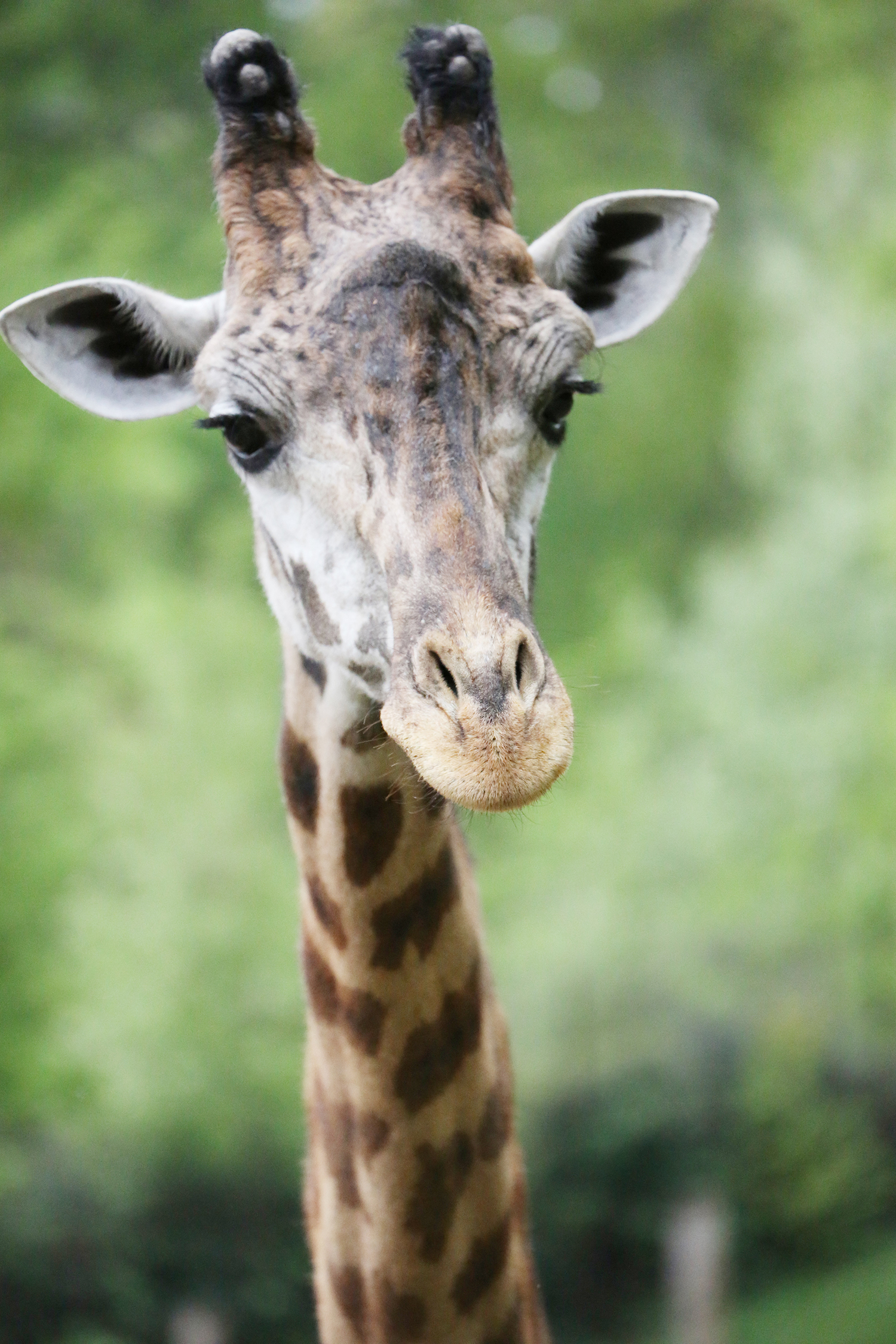
Masai giraffe at the Greenville Zoo, in Greenville, South Carolina

The zoo was approved by the Greenville City Council in 1957 and construction was started in 1960. The zoo opened to the public with mostly indigenous animals including bears, deer, bobcat, foxes, ducks and prairie dogs. A monkey dome was constructed in 1962, and 26 colobus monkeys were added to the zoos residents. In the latter part of the 1960s, the zoo was fenced, walkways were paved, and chimpanzee building was added to the exhibits. The zoo also added a sea lions, otters, a macaw and two leopards.

In the 1970s, elephants were brought to the zoo.

By 1981, the zoo was home to 70 animals in 11 display areas, and was expanded from 5 acres (2.0 ha) to the current 14 acres (5.7 ha). In 1984, the zoo was closed for major upgrades. It reopened in 1986 with a new education center, reptile building, gift and refreshment center, South American area, and waterfowl lagoon.

In 2002, the zoo opened the Cub Kingdom preschool playground, followed by an Asian Encounter exhibit in 2003. In 2008, the Masai giraffe exhibit, featuring Autumn and Walter, was opened to the public.

In 2014, Ladybird, a 44-year-old female African elephant, was euthanized after a month-long bout of abdominal pain left her immobile and unable to stand. There were plans for the remaining female African elephant, Joy, to be moved to another zoo, as AZA regulations prohibit zoos from holding single elephants. Joy the elephant died in route to the Cheyenne Mountain Zoo in Colorado. In 2015, the zoo turned the former elephant exhibit into a South American Pampas exhibit, first for a Giant anteater named Moe, later gaining two Rheas from New York's Queens Zoo.

In 2021 a new Amur leopard den was added, followed by the completion and unveiling of Primate Row, state-of-the-art primate enclosures that house four of the five protected primate species at the Greenville Zoo. After several years without an alligator, "Big Al," a twelve-foot-long American alligator became a resident of the Zoo. 14 new Chilean Flamingos and two Southern Screamers were added to the lagoon. A new species was introduced to the Zoo when "Bill & Ted," the Kunekune Pigs, came in September. The year ended with an inaugural "Holidays at the Zoo" event that helped break attendance and revenue records for December.

== Exhibits ==
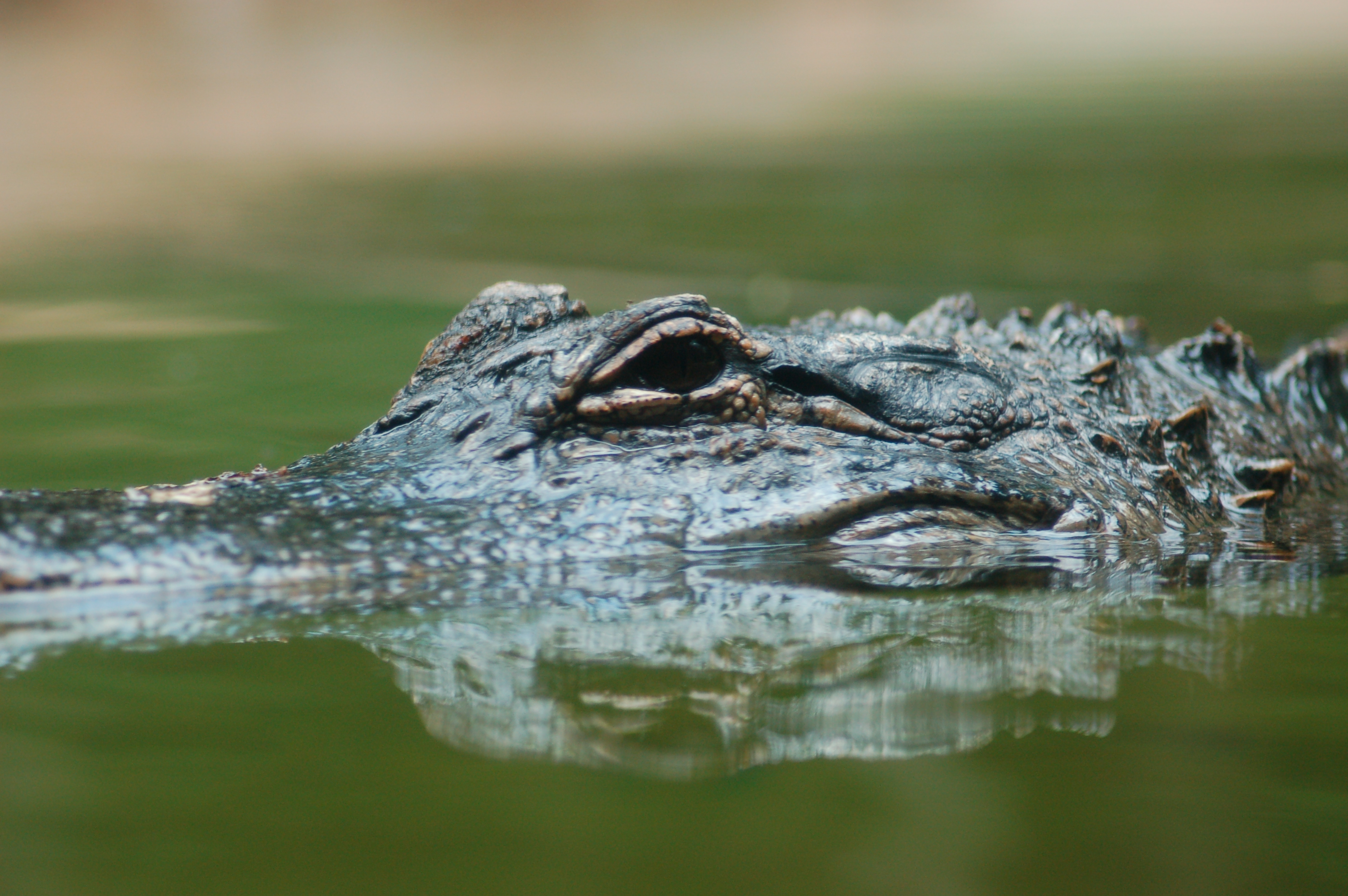
Alligator at the zoo

In October 2012, the Greenville Zoo welcomed its first giraffe calf. Kiko was born to Autumn, its female Masai giraffe, that is on a breeding loan from Boston's Franklin Park Zoo. Kiko will stay at the zoo for at least a year before officials at the Franklin Park Zoo determine where his permanent home will be. In June, Kiko traveled to the Toronto Zoo, making him the first giraffe born in South Carolina to cross into Canada.

On March 14, 2015, the zoo welcomed a baby gibbon, the first born at the Greenville Zoo. Also on June 21, 2015, the zoo welcomed a baby red panda who was named "Willie" after the country singer Willie Nelson.
