= Tierpark Dählhölzli =

Public zoo in Bern, Switzerland

- Interactive map of Tierpark Dählhölzli
- 46.934367°N 7.449721°E
- Date opened: 1937
- Location: Bern, Switzerland
- Land area: 15 ha (37 acres)
- No. of animals: 3,000
- No. of species: 236 species
- Website: www.tierpark-bern.ch

The Tierpark Dählhölzli, or Dählhölzli Zoo, is a public zoo in Bern, Switzerland.

It opened in 1937 and is operated by an affiliated association, the Tierparkverein Bern. The city of Bern owns the zoo and provides most of its financing. It is situated on the bank of the river Aare near the historical city center.

The zoo exhibits some 3,000 animals on 15 ha (37 acres) and employs a staff of 27. It also cares for the bears exhibited in the Bärengraben.

== History ==
The idea of opening a zoo with Europeans animals in the city of Bern was first bought in 1871 by a group of optimists with an idea, and a first small park was opened on Engehaldenstrasse in 1873 to house deer, bison and many small animals. It closed a few years later in 1876 due to a lack of funding. The idea of building a bigger zoo stayed in the air for a long time, and the site of Dählhölzli forest was even considered at a time to open a zoo for exotic animals in 1886.

=== The creation of the park ===
In 1901, a rich clockmaker from Loche of the name William Gabus gave 150 000 francs at his death to the city of Bern for the construction of a new zoological park, preferably on the site of Dählhözli forest. The project stalled for a time, but the city finally acquired a suitable land in 1918, the Elfenau estate. It seemed at the time that the terrain would be more adequate for a simple animal garden, but it was nonetheless the site chosen by the city council in 1927 to build the park. The design were put on the table and an association was founded to find partners for the construction of the zoo. The idea of creating an association proved useful, as it had more than 1800 members only two years later, and publicity in the cinema and on the street permitted to gain approximately 50,000 francs to help the construction. The association submitted a final draft in 1933 with a plan that respected the natural landscape of the Elfenau estate. All was going well, but dissident voices in the population started to have concern on the Elfenau estate site, considering the Dählhölzli one to be of better quality. The Berneses finally voted on the subject at the end of the year 1935 and the Dählhölzli was finally chosen.

=== The zoo since its opening ===
Finally, on June 5, 1935, The Tierpark Dählhölzli opened its doors to the public, in the presence of the Federal Council Rudolf Minger. managed by its first head-veterinary, Paul Badertscher. He gave his place the next year to a young doctor in zoology, Heini Hediger, who stayed at the helm until 1943, and wrote a book in which he recalled his experience in the park during the war, the difficulties to find food and material to care for the animals and how the Park Association helped him cope with what was happening in Europe at the time.

The third person to manage the park was professor Monika Meyer-Holzapfel, from 1943 to 1969. Many new enclosures were built at that time and the number of vivariums also increased. A new vision on the place of zoos in the conservation efforts took place at that time and the Tierpark Bern participated in projects for many European animals. The motto of his successor, Prof. Hannes Sägesser, was "the Bernesers Zoo", who managed the park from 1969 until his death in 1991. He brought more exotic animals to the zoo and opened the zoopedagogy center to help children, a facility still in operation today. Dr. Max Müller was the fifth person to occupy the position, as he opened the children-zoo with farm animals and he further brought the trend of exotic animals in the zoo.

Since 1997, Dr Bernd Schildger is the director of the Dählhözli Tierpark Bern, under the slogan "More space for less animals". The park officially became a registered scientific organisation under the norms of the EU in 2010, which facilitate the conservation efforts and exchanges with other institutions.

An extensive remodeling of the park is planned for the time until 2033. In December 2024 the plans for the rezoning and remodelling were submitted for public review. The public vote for the rezoning is expected for 2026. Among other things, the remodeling should reduce the number of animals exhibited and increase the space available to them. Furthermore, the entire area of the Zoo should become accessible for people with handicaps.

== Statistics and animal species ==
Number of species in Tierpark Bern
Mammals	Birds	Reptiles	Amphibians	Fishes	Invertebrates	Total
39	30	31	9	63	64	236

Among the most popular animals, the zoo houses gray wolves, bison, otters, carpathian lynx, muskox, brown bear, boars, and many others. There is also a great variety of birds, from the Alps and abroad, like the rock ptarmigan, the snowy owl, flamingos, the black stork, the Bali myna, etc. Vivariums and aquarium also gives a great view of reptiles, amphibians, invertebrates and fishes from Europe and beyond.

== Exhibits and attractions ==
Half of the Tierpark Bern can be visited for free, including the enclosure next to the Aar River, the Children Zoo or the flamingos and tetras enclosure. The other half necessitate a ticket that can be bought in the vivarium pavilion.

=== Aviary ===
A new aviary was built in 2016 to house some species of owls, crows, and other carnivorous or omnivore birds. The new construction has a height of ten meters and covers an area of 750 square meters. The habitat has enough space to permit flight and rocky or wooden surfaces to help nidification. The project was almost entirely financed by the zoo association.

== Researches and conservation ==
The Dählhölzli Zoo also participate in many conservation and research projects in collaboration with other institutions.

The zoo has a research project on the biology of pigeon and ways to live alongside them. The association of the zoo is helping finding ways to manage the pigeon population in Bern.

== Other ==
A book was published in 2017 to celebrate the 80 years of the zoo. The book was written by Sebastian Bentz and retraced the history of the zoological park and the philosophy behind the management at each decade.
