= Bokito (gorilla) =

German-born Dutch Western gorilla (1996–2023)

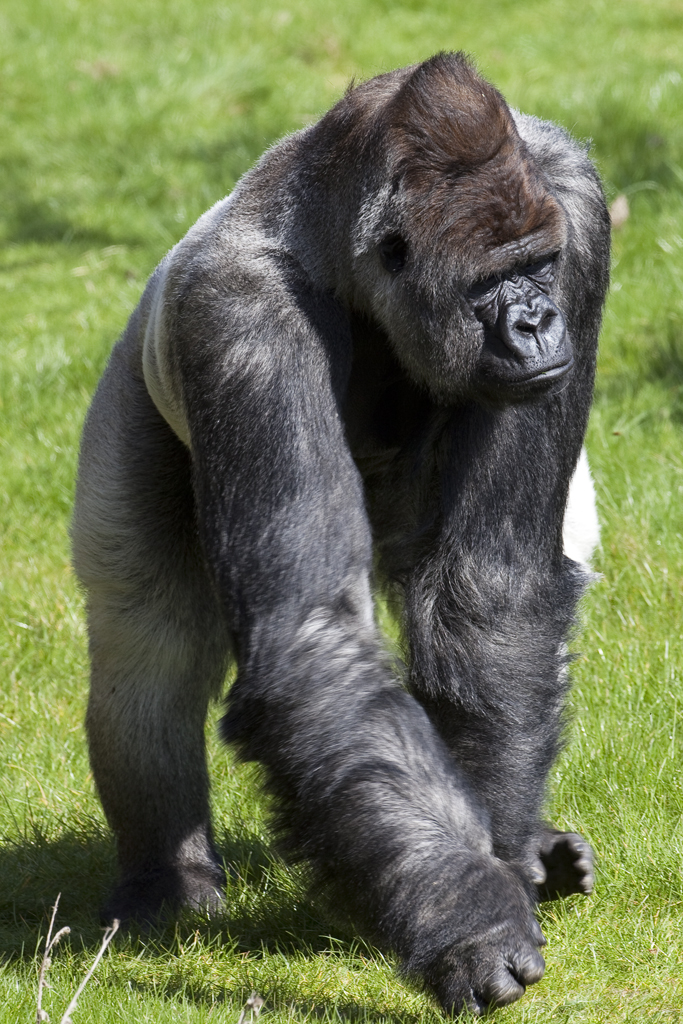
- Bokito on 17 April 2010.
- Species: Western gorilla
- Sex: Male
- Born: 14 March 1996; Berlin, Germany
- Died: 4 April 2023 (aged 27); Rotterdam, Netherlands
- Cause of death: heart failure
- Resting place: Natural History Museum Rotterdam
- Known for: 2007 escape and attack of a zoo visitor
- Residence: Diergaarde Blijdorp
- Parents: Derrick (m), M'penzi (f)

Bokito (14 March 1996 – 4 April 2023) was a male western gorilla born in captivity, who lived most of his life in Diergaarde Blijdorp zoo in Rotterdam, the Netherlands. He became the subject of considerable international media coverage after escaping from his enclosure on 18 May 2007, abducting a female visitor and severely injuring her. The incident made him Blijdorp's best-known animal.

== Biography ==
Bokito was born in the Zoologischer Garten Berlin, Germany. His father was the gorilla Derrick and his mother M’penzi. As M’penzi was unable to nurse him for a sufficient period, zookeepers hand-reared Bokito from an early age.

As part of a breeding programme, and to avoid the risk of inbreeding, Bokito was transferred to Diergaarde Blijdorp in August 2005. After six months, it was decided that Bokito would remain in Rotterdam permanently. Bokito was the dominant male of his gorilla group. He fathered ten offspring with multiple females, born between October 2006 and February 2022.

In November 2021 it was announced that Bokito’s group had been infected with COVID-19.

=== Death ===
Bokito died on 4 April 2023, at the age of 27. Two days before his death, he showed signs of illness. His faeces were examined the following day and he was placed under close observation. When his condition failed to improve, he was anaesthetised to administer fluids. He died during the procedure. A post-mortem examination conducted on behalf of Diergaarde Blijdorp determined heart failure as the cause of death.

In November 2023, Blijdorp indicated that they would stop hosting gorillas after Bokito's death, stating that it would be a risk to introduce a new male and that the zoo needed the space for other conservancy efforts.

In January 2024, Blijdorp announced that Bokito would serve as an object of study of the musculoskeletal system of apes, with a detailed scan of him to be made by KU Leuven. His remains would subsequently be made available to the Natural History Museum Rotterdam, where they would be stored for at least ten years before being added to the collection on display.

== Escape incident ==
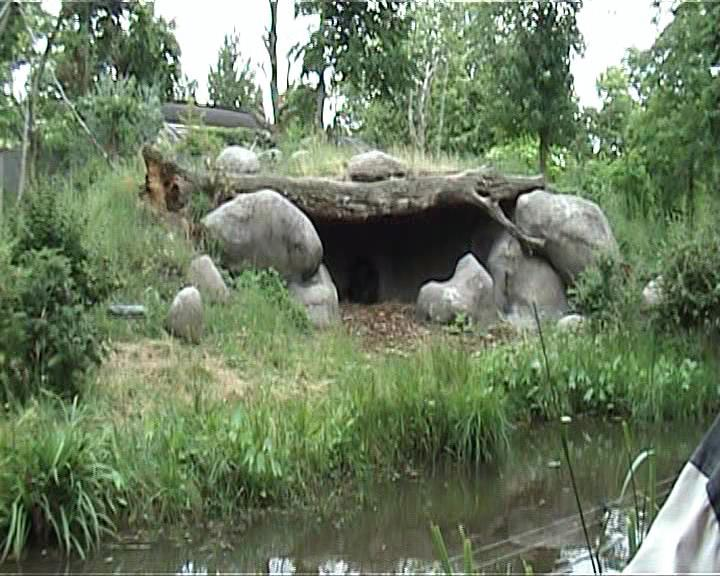
Gorilla island enclosure in Blijdorp (2005)

On 18 May 2007, the day of the zoo’s 150th anniversary, Bokito jumped over the 3.5-metre-wide (11 ft) water-filled ditch and barbed wire that separated his island enclosure in Rotterdam from the public. He then attacked a woman, dragging her around for tens of metres and inflicting bone fractures as well as more than a hundred bite wounds. She later held the zoo liable for the damages suffered. Bokito subsequently entered a nearby restaurant, causing panic among the visitors. During this encounter, three more people were injured as a result of the panic. After approximately one hour, the gorilla was tranquillised and returned to his enclosure. Due to the incident, the thousands of visitors that were present in the zoo at the time were evacuated.

=== Background ===
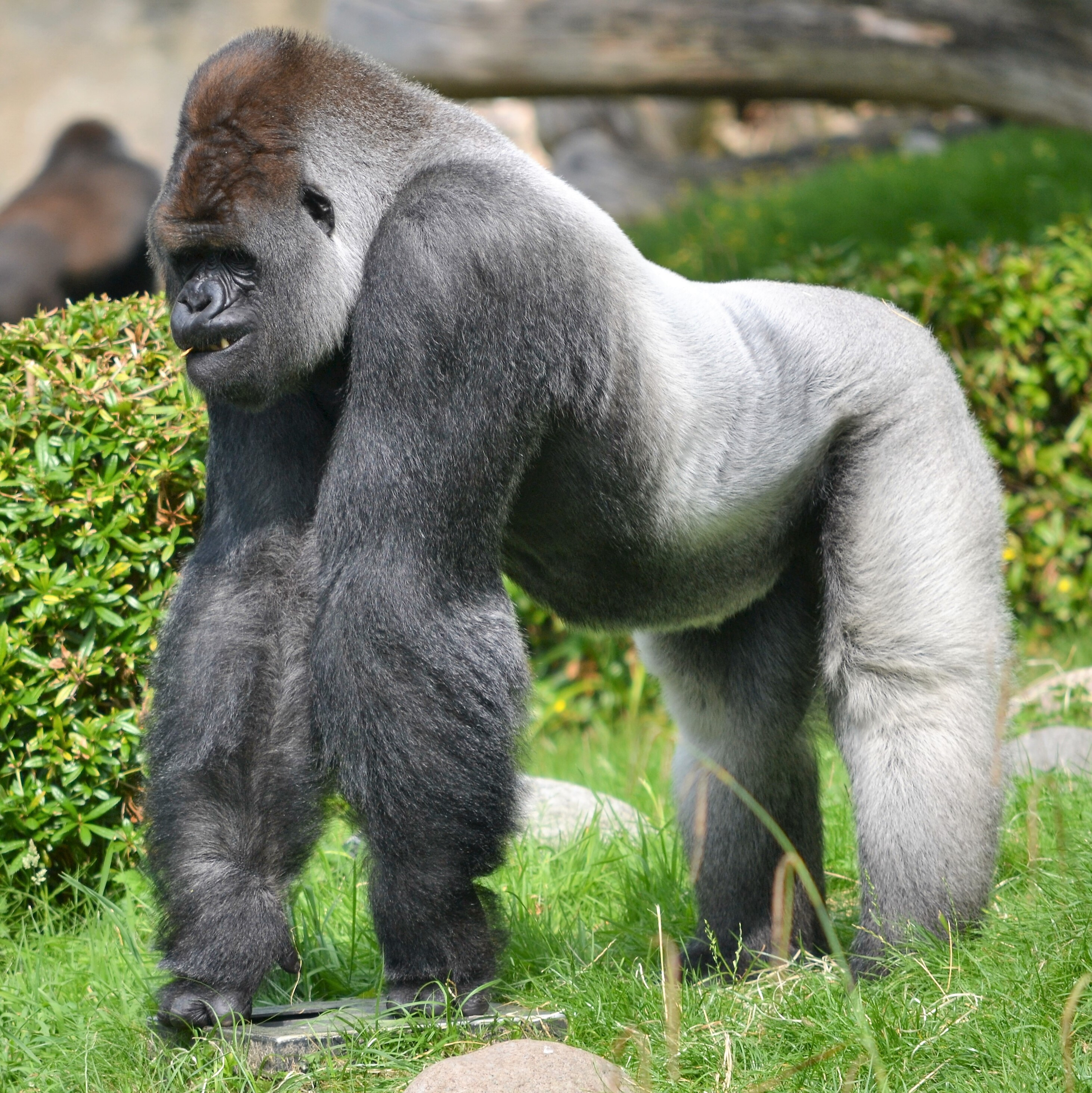
Bokito in 2016

As a juvenile, Bokito had been raised by Berlin zookeeper Reimon Opitz, who cared for him in her home like a human baby. She bottle-fed him every three hours, changed his nappies, took him to restaurants, and other public places. She gave him baths, which may have diminished his fear of water.

Bokito experienced a difficult time when he was first returned to his fellow kin as an adolescent. He was an outsider and fixated on humans. Eventually, he began to exhibit stereotypical stress behaviour.

Bokito had previously escaped from his enclosure on two occasions during his time in Berlin. In the summer of 2004, Bokito escaped from his enclosure and climbed over its 3-metre-high (9.8 ft) glass wall. On that occasion, he displayed no aggressive behaviour and was returned to his enclosure without incident.

In April, shortly before the May 2007 escape, Bokito’s rival within the group, a male named Dango, was transferred along with two females to the Shanghai Zoo. Changes in the hierarchical composition of primate groups can lead to behavioural changes in a newly established alpha male.

The injured woman had been a regular visitor to the great apes' enclosure, visiting an average of four times per week. She had a habit of touching the glass that separated the public from the gorillas, whilst making eye contact with Bokito and smiling at him. Zoo employees had warned her a few days earlier to keep her distance and avoid direct eye contact. This sustained staring is thought to have contributed to the attack. Although in humans, smiling is a friendly behaviour, in gorillas it is a practice that is discouraged by primatologists, as apes are likely to interpret teeth exposure as a challenge or a form of aggressive display. Speaking from the hospital in an interview with De Telegraaf she said; “He is and remains my darling. Since he arrived at Blijdorp, I have made contact with him. If I placed my hand on the glass, he did the same. If I smiled at him, he smiled back.”

Children throwing rocks at Bokito at the time of the incident likely also contributed to his escape.

=== Expert opinions ===
Jan van Hooff, evolutionary biologist and primatologist, who obtained his PhD in facial expressions in chimpanzees, concluded from videos of the woman's earlier visits that Bokito did not display threatening behaviour. Baring one's teeth can have multiple meanings, such as fear or social arousal, but in the footage Bokito showed no signs of fear or aggression. He did beat his chest, which Van Hooff interpreted as display behaviour rather than hostility. According to Van Hooff, Bokito showed what he described as a “vertical bare-teeth face”, a greeting expression used by male gorillas to reassure females. He suggested that Bokito may have become frustrated because the woman, who appeared to show interest, repeatedly walked away. Van Hooff speculated on what might have happened had she remained still rather than resisting. "I think he would have given her a few slaps on the back. And then, yes, he might have done what male gorillas do with female gorillas."

Behavioural biologist of Royal Burgers' Zoo, Wineke Schoo, noted that prolonged staring is uncomfortable for gorillas. While females seeking to mate may stare intently at a male, gorillas generally avoid direct eye contact and rely heavily on peripheral vision. The biting and dragging behaviour displayed by Bokito is considered normal towards female gorillas that do not submit. However, such behaviour has far more severe consequences for humans due to differences in skin thickness and bone strength. Gorillas are estimated to be several times stronger than humans. Under normal circumstances, gorillas are generally calm animals.

=== Aftermath ===
Following the incident, Blijdorp implemented additional safety measures to the enclosure to prevent further escapes.

The word "bokitoproof", meaning "durable enough to resist the actions of an enraged gorilla" and by extension "durable enough to resist the actions of a non-specific extreme situation" was voted the Word of the Year for 2007 in the Netherlands.

According to the Dutch trademark office, the name Bokito was subsequently registered as a brand for commercial and promotional services in 2007.

== See also ==
- List of individual apes
