= Jos Wildlife Park =

Wildlife park in Jos, Nigeria

- Location within Nigeria
- Interactive map of Jos Wildlife Park
- Location: Nigeria
- Coordinates: 9°53′07″N 8°50′55″E
- Area: 8 km^{2} (3.1 sq mi)
- Governing body: Nigerian Conservation Foundation

Jos Wildlife Park, known as one of the Plateau State's topmost tourist attractions and a place in Nigeria where nature has been conserved. The sights and sounds of nature and wildlife unfold in the park, located in the middle belt of Nigeria along the Jos-Miango road, about 5 kilometres (3.1 miles) from the city of Jos, and covering an area of 8 square kilometres (3.1 square miles). It is one of the biggest natural/artificial zoological garden and park in Nigeria.

The park is playing a major part in the development, promotion of tourism and ecotourism in Nigeria.

== History ==
In 1972, the Jos wildlife park was established by the governor, Joseph Gomwalk.

The park offers picnic spots in the pine forest and atop Vongnifwel Hill, the highest point east of Jos at 1,345 metres (4,413 feet) above sea level, which makes it unique for its collection of uncommon and exotic animals.

== Wildlife ==
The park is an habitat for various animals, mammals, birds, reptiles included.

- Herbivores: elephants, cattle, elands, gazelles and others can be found at the park
- Carnivores: the park has several lions, crocodiles, hyenas, pythons and other carnivores
- Birds: ostriches, the crowned crane, vultures are among the flight animals the park is proud too have.

In 2020, Mr. Zendi Mukuk an animal lover donated a pregnant African rock python to the park.

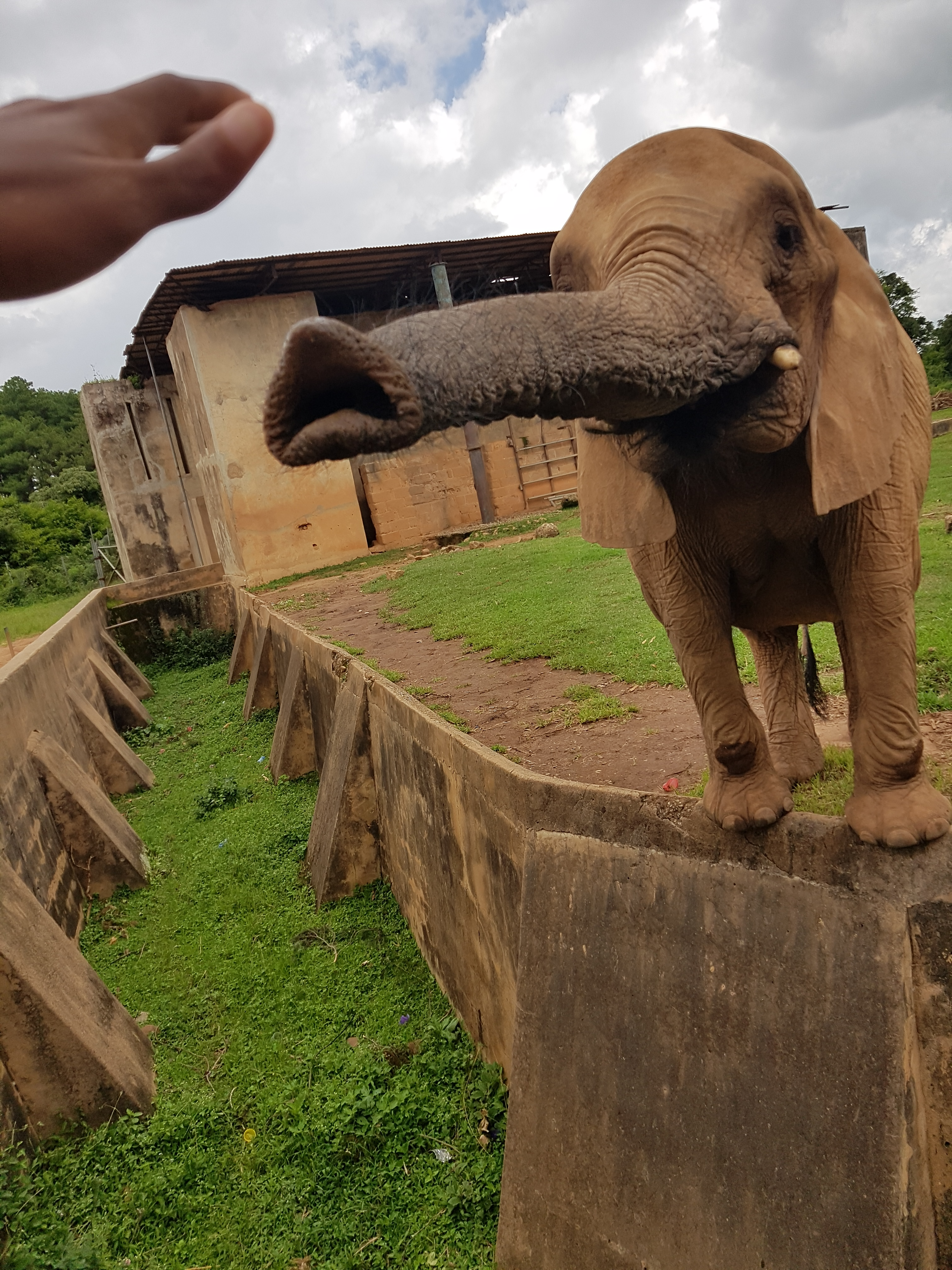
Elephant at Jos Wildlife Park
