= Tropiquaria =

Tropiquaria Zoo
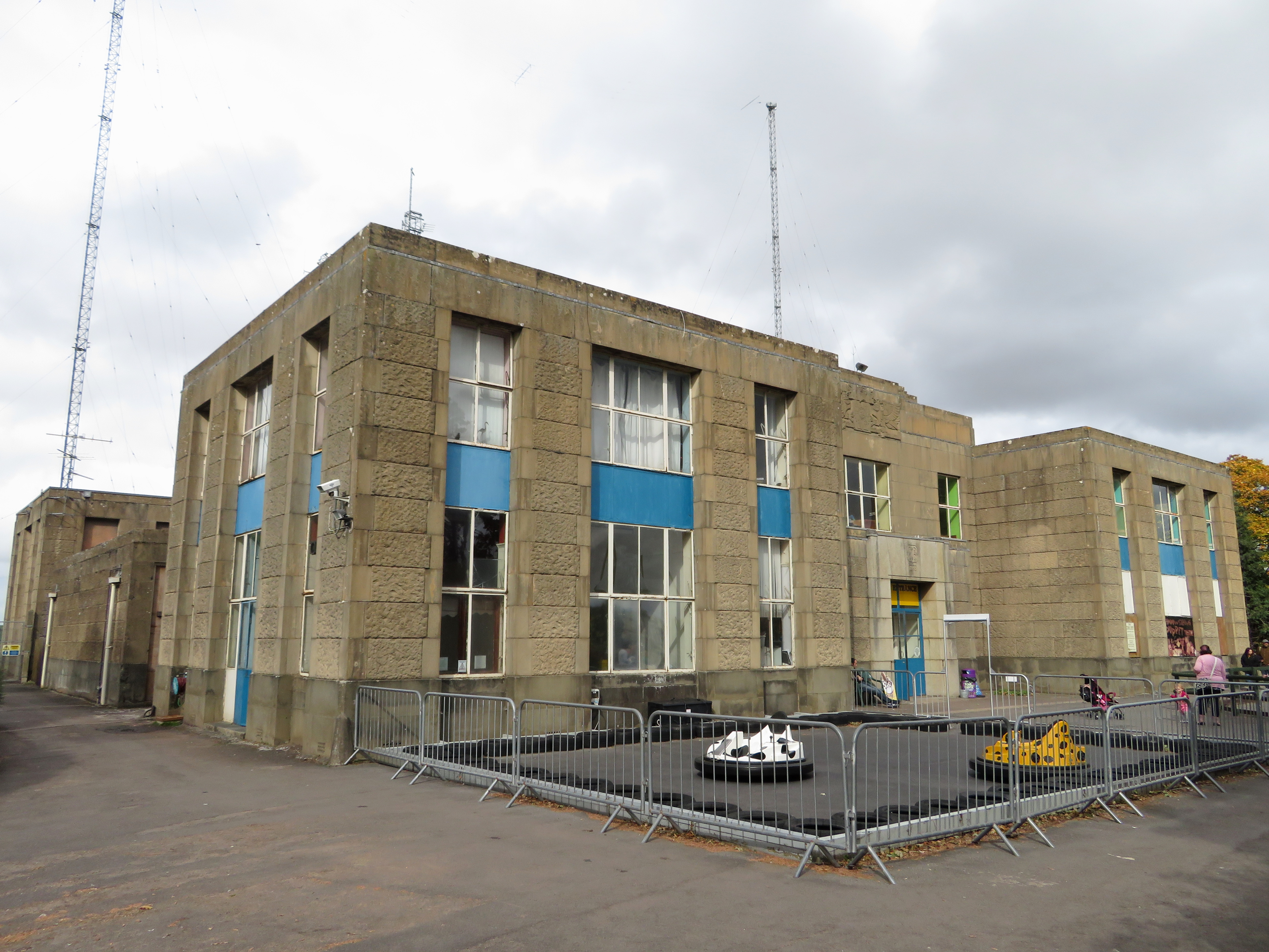
- The former BBC transmitter building, now the site of the indoor features of Tropiquaria.
- Interactive map of Tropiquaria Zoo
- 51.1609°N 3.3489°W
- Location: Washford Cross, Somerset, England
- Memberships: BIAZA
- Website: www.tropiquaria.co.uk

Listed Building – Grade II
- Official name: Washford Transmitting Station
- Designated: 25 January 1984
- Reference no.: 1057461

Tropiquaria Zoo is a small tropical house and zoo in Somerset, England. It is located at Washford Cross, 16 miles (26 km) from Taunton and 9 miles (14 km) from Minehead.

It is based in a 1930s art deco BBC radio transmitter hall of Washford transmitting station, which became a Grade II listed building in 1984.

Tropiquaria opened on the site in 1989. The majority of the old transmitting station building became surplus to the BBC's requirements in 1981 when new, smaller equipment was installed in a separate building to the rear. In 1987, a £100,000 scheme to transform the unused part of the building into an aquarium and reptile house was proposed by the consortium Ark Enterprises Ltd, headed by Stephen Smith. Both a 21-year lease on the building and planning permission were acquired in 1987.

There is a mainly African theme to the tropical hall and aquarium as well as the large number of outside enclosures. The zoo is a member of BIAZA, the British and Irish Association of Zoos and Aquariums, and has successfully bred a number of endangered species of mammals, reptiles, birds, and fish.

Tropiquaria includes a Tropical Hall with a variety of snakes and lizards, and birds. The zoo also features an aquarium with several species of endangered, critically endangered and even extinct in the wild species of fish. Outside are macaws, helmeted curassow, cockatoos, parrots, agoutis, gibbons, serval, wildcats, wallabies, emus, rheas, tapir, cotton-top tamarins, red-handed tamarins, ring-tailed lemurs, ruffed lemurs, brown lemurs, coatis, yellow mongoose and meerkats amongst many others.

There are also a number of outdoor play areas, an indoor play area and cafe.

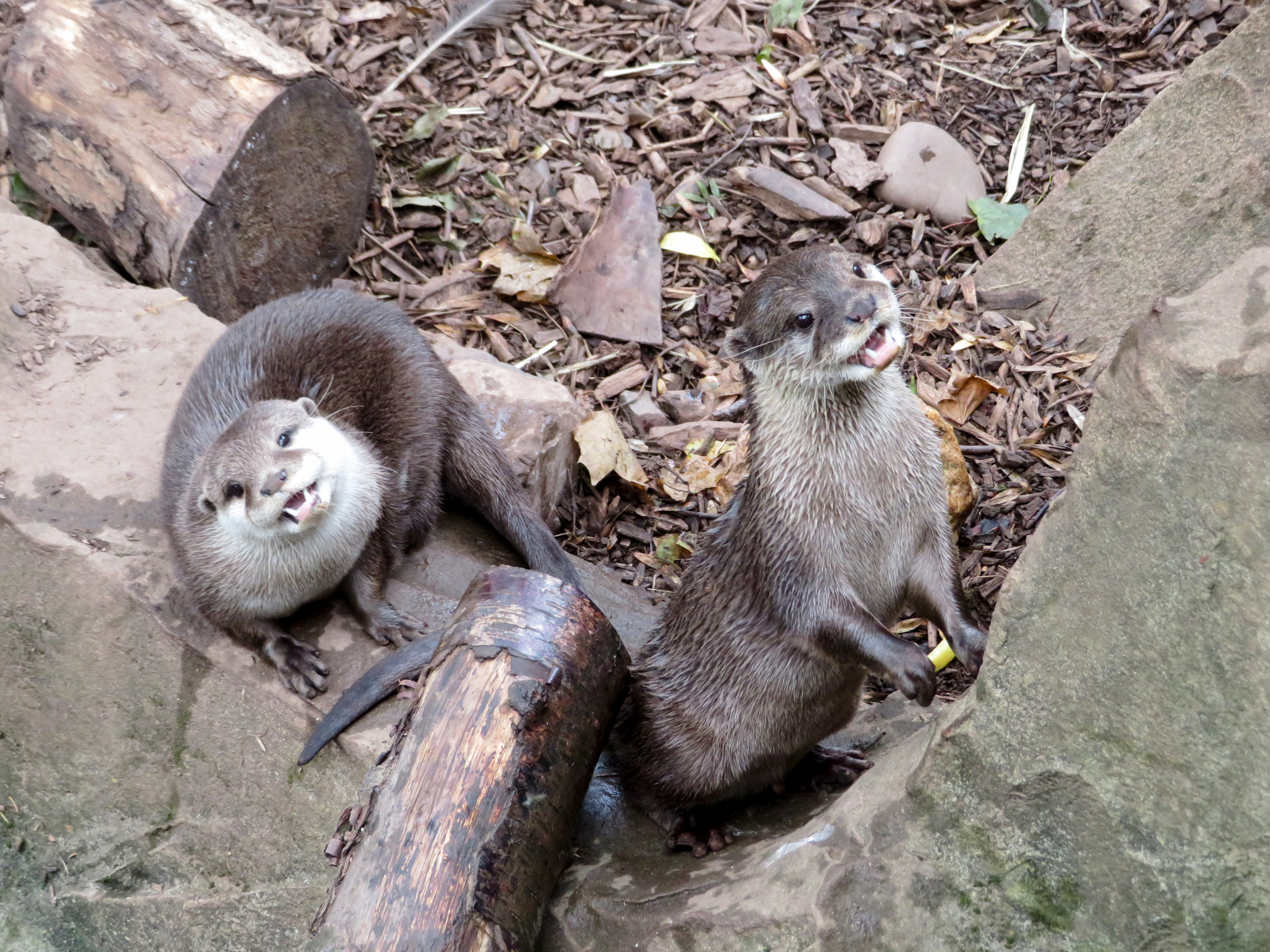
Otters at Tropiquaria
