= Papanack Park Zoo =

Zoo in Alfred and Plantagenet, Canada

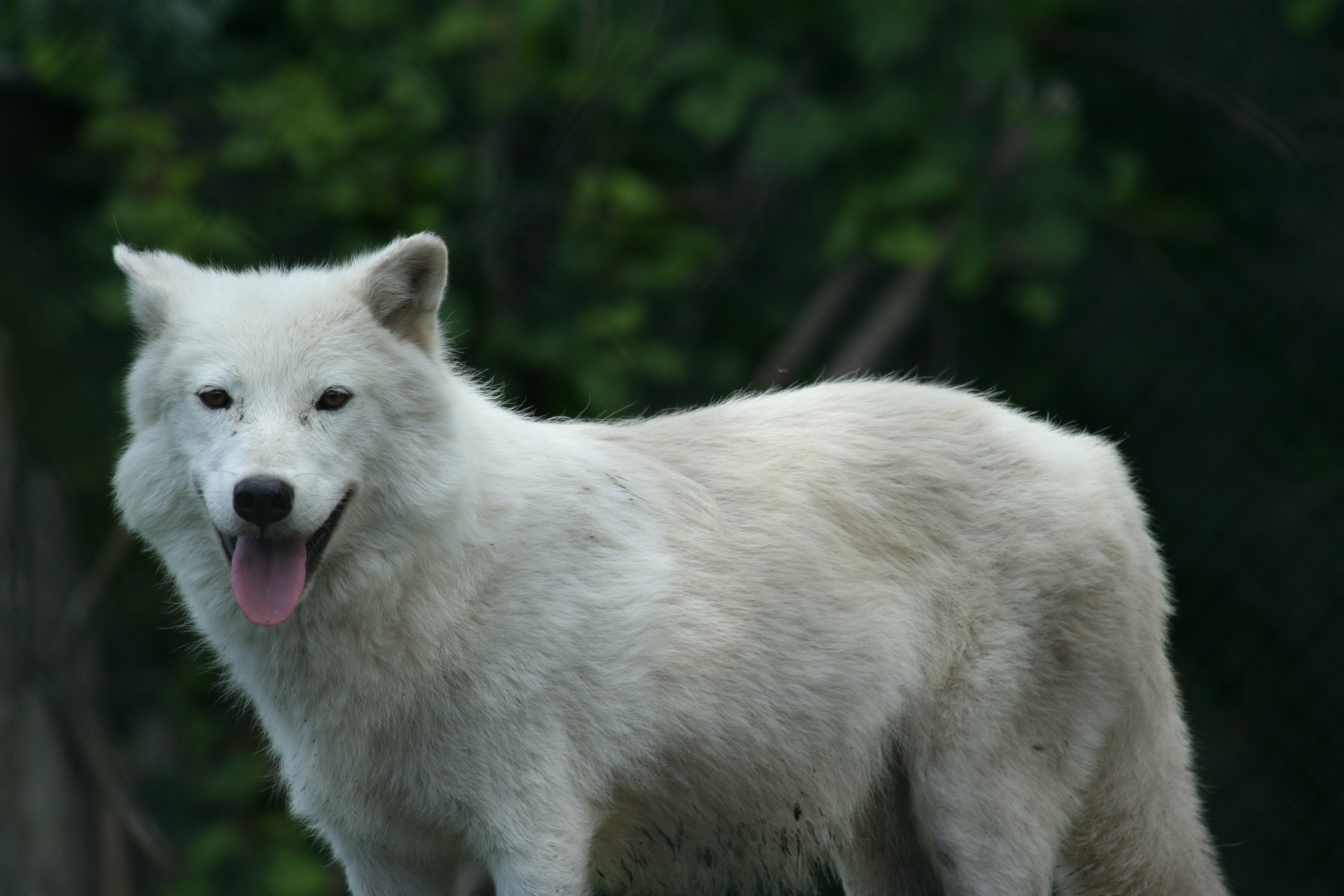
- An arctic wolf, canis lupus arctos, at the zoo
- Interactive map of Papanack Park Zoo
- 45°33′34.1″N 75°07′13.7″W
- Date opened: 1994
- Location: Wendover, Ontario Canada
- No. of species: 36
- Website: http://papanackzoo.com/

The Papanack Park Zoo is a small zoo in Wendover, Ontario, Canada. It opened in 1994 and came under new ownership in 2014 with the intention of acting as a conservation park.

It has 36 different species, including snow monkeys, cougars, snow leopard and white lion cubs. These cubs are the offspring of the zoo's African lions although they did not stay white as they grew. It also has four white Bengal tigers including a "snowball" tiger named Venus. The zoo is approximately a 25-minute drive from Canada's capital, Ottawa.

In 2016, a lion named Zeus escaped from the zoo due to human error. It was shot and killed because of concerns for public safety.

In 2016, undercover footage was released by Animal Justice depicting acts of animal cruelty including a zoo manager describing how he trained a lion cub by repeatedly hitting the baby animal in the face. It also includes the zoo's management stating that several Père David's deer (extinct in the wild) broke their necks after running into the fence of their enclosure.

In 2021, a kangaroo named Willow escaped her enclosure before being found by the side of the road injured. The kangaroo died.
