= Zoo La Garenne =

La Garenne
- Parc animalier la Garenne

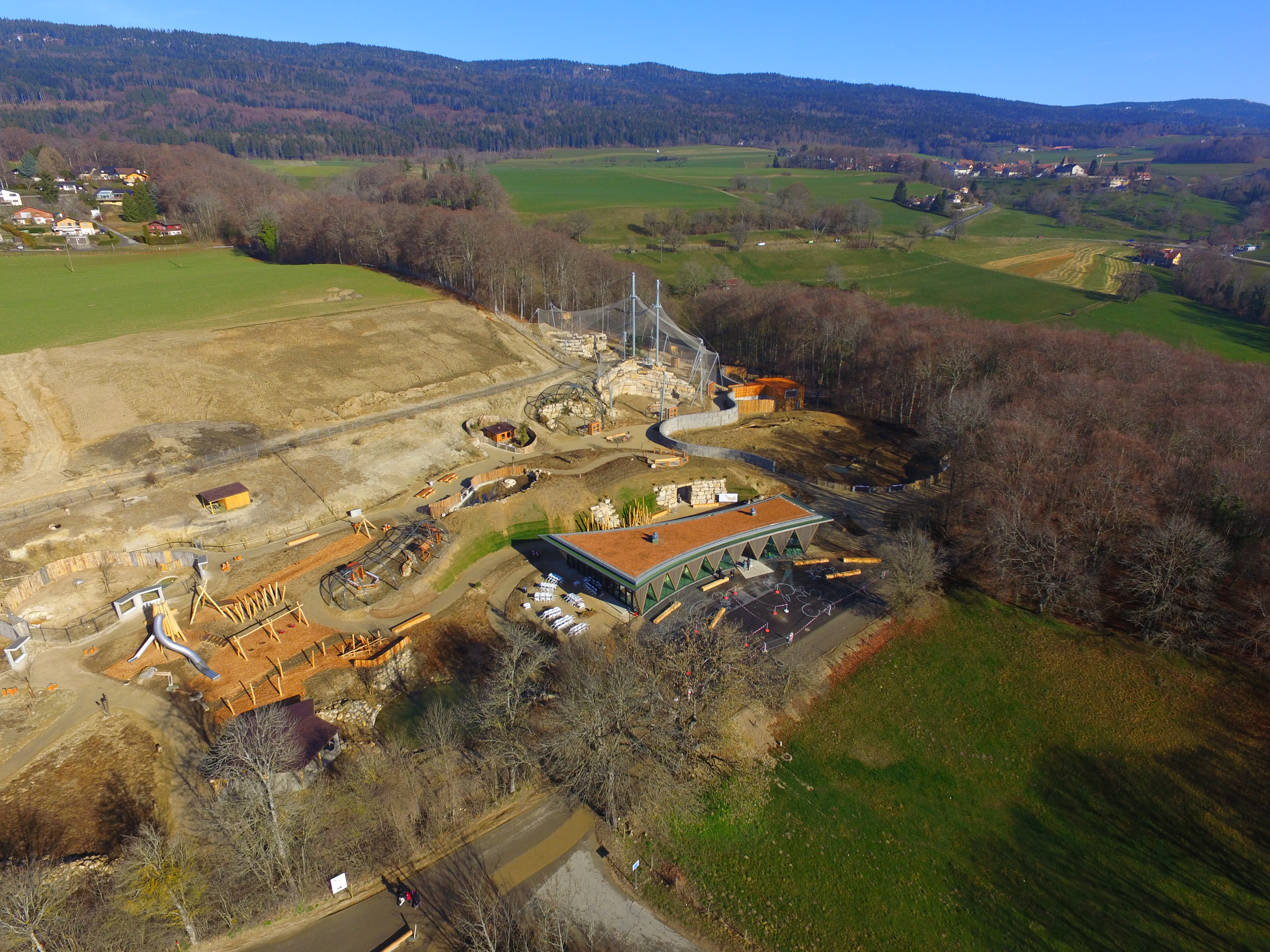
- Zoo La Garenne aerial
- Interactive map of La Garenne
- 46.4790874°N 6.2452621°E
- Date opened: 1965; 61 years ago
- Location: Le Vaud, Vaud, Switzerland
- Land area: 3 hectares
- No. of animals: 300
- No. of species: about 43 species
- Annual visitors: 90,000
- Website: www.lagarenne.ch

La Garenne (or Parc animalier de la faune européenne La Garenne) is a small zoo (or animal park) located in Le Vaud, Vaud in Switzerland. The park specializes in the conservation and promotion of Swiss fauna, particularly small animals and birds of prey. The zoo also has a care center for wild animals.

== General ==
The park is located on 3 hectares of land (30,000 m^{2}) and is the home of approximately 300 animals. La Garenne welcomes approximately 90,000 visitors every year; between 250 and 100 visitors daily, with 3000 on peak days. The park is a member of the ZooSchweiz and WAZA.

The park is the propriety of the Fondation La Garenne, a not for profit organization that manages the park and its inhabitants. This foundation gets most of its financing from its affiliate association, the Association des Amis de la Garenne. The goal of the association is to realize the objectives of the zoo through monetary and moral support. The foundation receives funds from membership contribution, one-time donations, sponsorships from societies and government, and charitable giving from inheritances of private individuals.

=== Organization of the park ===
In 2014, the park relocated on new land and it reopened in 2016.

The new park La Garenne possess the biggest aviary in Europe, with a height of 28 m at its highest point. Visitors can walk among rock walls where the birds build their nests.

The new entrance pavilion of the park was created by LOCALARCHITECTURE. It is a long building with large triangular windows giving a view on to the park. The pavilion is built entirely of wood and has a green roof covered with local alpine plant species. Many service are offered inside the pavilion, including a gift shop, restaurant and reception area.

Since its creation, La Garenne has been an important actor in the care and rehabilitation of wild animals found by people in the area. Its care center is still in operation, and more than 1600 animals of many species have been released to the wild after care in the center. Every year approximately 450 animals are brought to the center. Of that number, 40% will be released in the wild. Some animals will get a home in other zoos. Handicapped animals are often kept in the zoo for reproduction.

Another important part of the mission of La Garenne is the education of the public on the subject of the environment and the local fauna. There is a classroom for school children and groups.

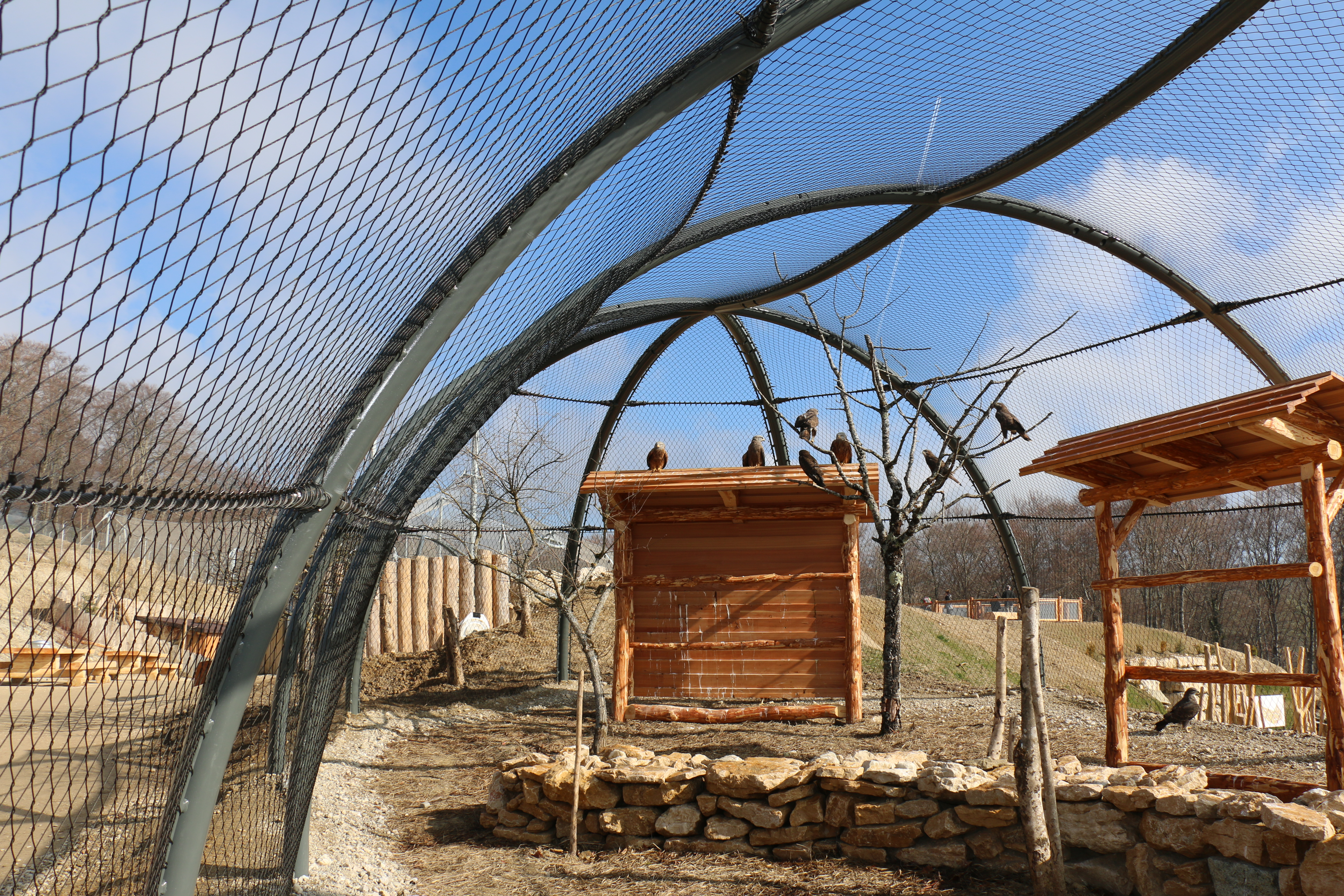
Inside the aviary in La Garenne

=== Mission of the foundation ===
The Fondation La Garenne has a general mission on four planes that it has retained since its creation:

- Retrieving and caring for wild animals in difficulty
- Participating in the survival and the reintroduction of vulnerable species
- Proposing education services on the subject of the environment
- Showing the Swiss fauna to the public

=== Some species (among others) ===
Mammals: wolf, lynx, fox, Saas sheep, Alpine ibex, goat, wild boar, mangalia, groundhog, coypu, beaver and racoon.

Birds: bearded vulture, little owl, woodpeckers, waterfowl, ducks, kestrel, passerines, barn owl, Eurasian eagle-owl, griffon vulture and northern bald ibis.

Reptiles and amphibians: European pond turtle, common toad, Alpine newt, black salamander and common frog.

There is also an anthill to observe the insects at work and the park also has a great diversity of flora species from the area.

== History ==
The Zoo La Garenne was founded in 1952 by Erwin Meier with the idea to promote and help the conservation of the fauna of Switzerland, and also as a place to care for hurt or handicapped animals, as well abandoned pets. The park was first built on 6,100 m^{2} of land. The park opened its doors to the public in 1962.

The Association des Amis de la Garenne was created in 1975 to give financial support to the project. After years of educating the public about the ecology of the area and its conservation efforts to the fauna of Switzerland, the zoo was recognized in 1977 for its public utility.

In 2004, the foundation of the park started to reflect on the sustainability of the park: the infrastructure was old, the financing was insufficient, and the public was not as interested as it once was. Many ideas were put on the table, but opposition from the public forced the foundation to rethink its ideas many times. The idea of creating a bigger park was proposed, and the opposition ended. New construction started in April 2014. The project was launched on new land at a cost of 14.5 million Swiss francs.

In 2016, after two years of construction, the park reopened in its new form on 3 hectares. The zoo is now more akin to a wildlife park, with enclosures instead of cages, where visitors can see the fauna from a few meters away and can be inside the aviary. During its reconstruction, the zoo decided to keep only local animals as much as possible and had to find new homes for many of its exotic inhabitants, approximately 30 animals. The park now concentrates its efforts on the promotion and conservation of uniquely Swiss species.

== Conservation of the bearded vulture ==
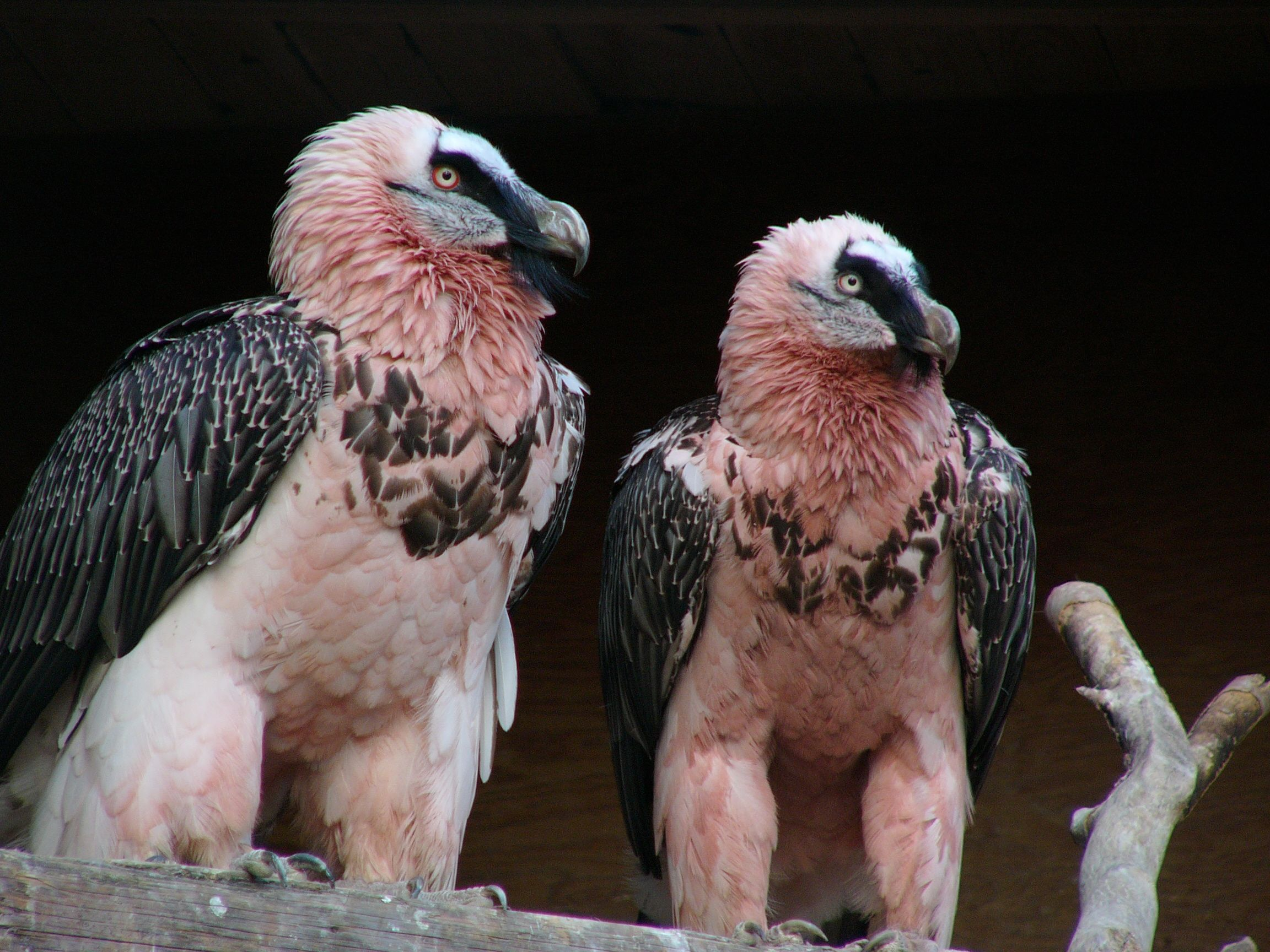
Bearded vultures in La Garenne

La Garenne was one of the first animal park in Switzerland to enter the program for the reproduction and rehabilitation of the bearded vulture in the Alps. The zoo was part of the program for the rehabilitation of the bird in the Alps since its inception. The first bearded vulture was born in La Garenne in 1986. One of the females born in La Garenne was released into the wild in 1989. Since then, many birds born in the park have been released in many habitats in Europe.

Aged 46 years, the male bearded vulture of La Garenne, Athos, died from an infection, worsened by his old age. He fathered more than 25 birds. Athos came to La Garenne in 1972 and has fathered 13 bearded vultures released in the Alps. The body of Athos was preserved at the Musée Cantonnal de zoologie à Lausanne, and the naturalized bird was loaned to La Garenne. Athos is one of the oldest bearded vultures ever recorded in the world. The mother of the first bearded vulture to be born in the wild in the Alps in 1997 was from La Garenne.

A new 22-year-old male, Helios, came to the park in 2016 to take the place of Athos alongside Athia, the 26-year-old female.
