= Linden Tree of King Matthias =

Tree in Slovakia

- Bojnická lipa or Lipa kráľa Mateja
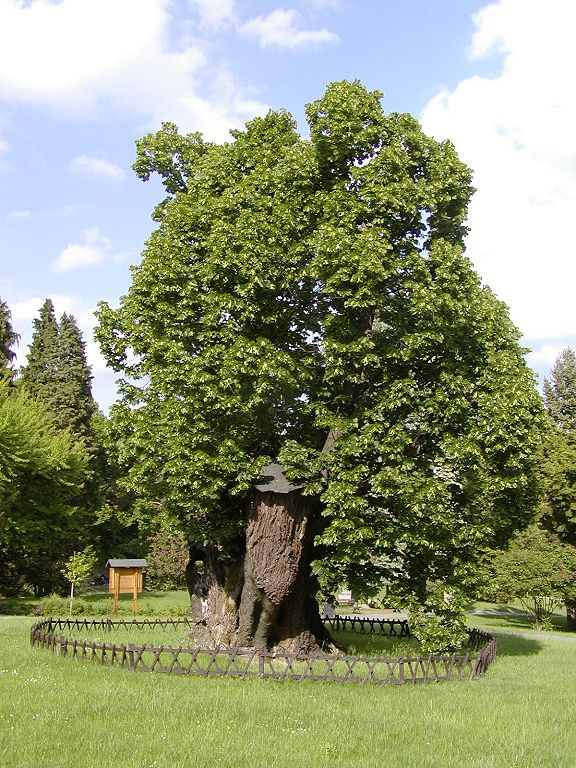
- Linden Tree of King Matthias (2007)
- Interactive map of Linden Tree of King Matthias
- Location: Bojnice, Trenčin Region, Slovakia
- Type: Linden, Tilia platyphyllos
- Height: 9 meters

The Linden Tree of King Matthias (Slovak: Bojnická lipa or Lipa kráľa Mateja; also known as King Matthias's Lime) is an over 700-year-old specimen of large-leaved lime (Tilia platyphyllos) located within the gardens of Bojnice Castle. It is one of the thickest and oldest trees in the whole of Slovakia. The tree is named after the King of Hungary, Matthias Corvinus.

Since 1962, the tree has been declared a protected natural creation.

== History ==
According to historical legend, the linden was planted by Matthew III Csák of Trenčín in 1301 when Andrew III of Hungary, the last king of the Árpád dynasty, died. One of the owners of the Bojnice Castle, King Mathias Corvinus of Hungary (1458–1490), who is believed to have taken pleasure in residing in Bojnice, frequently hosted banquets beneath the linden tree. His affection for the Bojnice linden trees is recorded in a letter that ends with the words "Sub nostris dilectis tillis bojniciensibus" ("Under our beloved Bojnice linden trees").

The first three powerful branches broke off under their own weight before the First World War. The others on the northern and southern sides could not withstand the onslaught of a storm later, and the last strong side branch on the southern side fell victim to a strong wind in the spring of 1952.

On October 27, 2005, another tree that was grafted from Linden tree was planted next to it personally by the then president of Slovakia, Ivan Gašparovič.

== Description ==
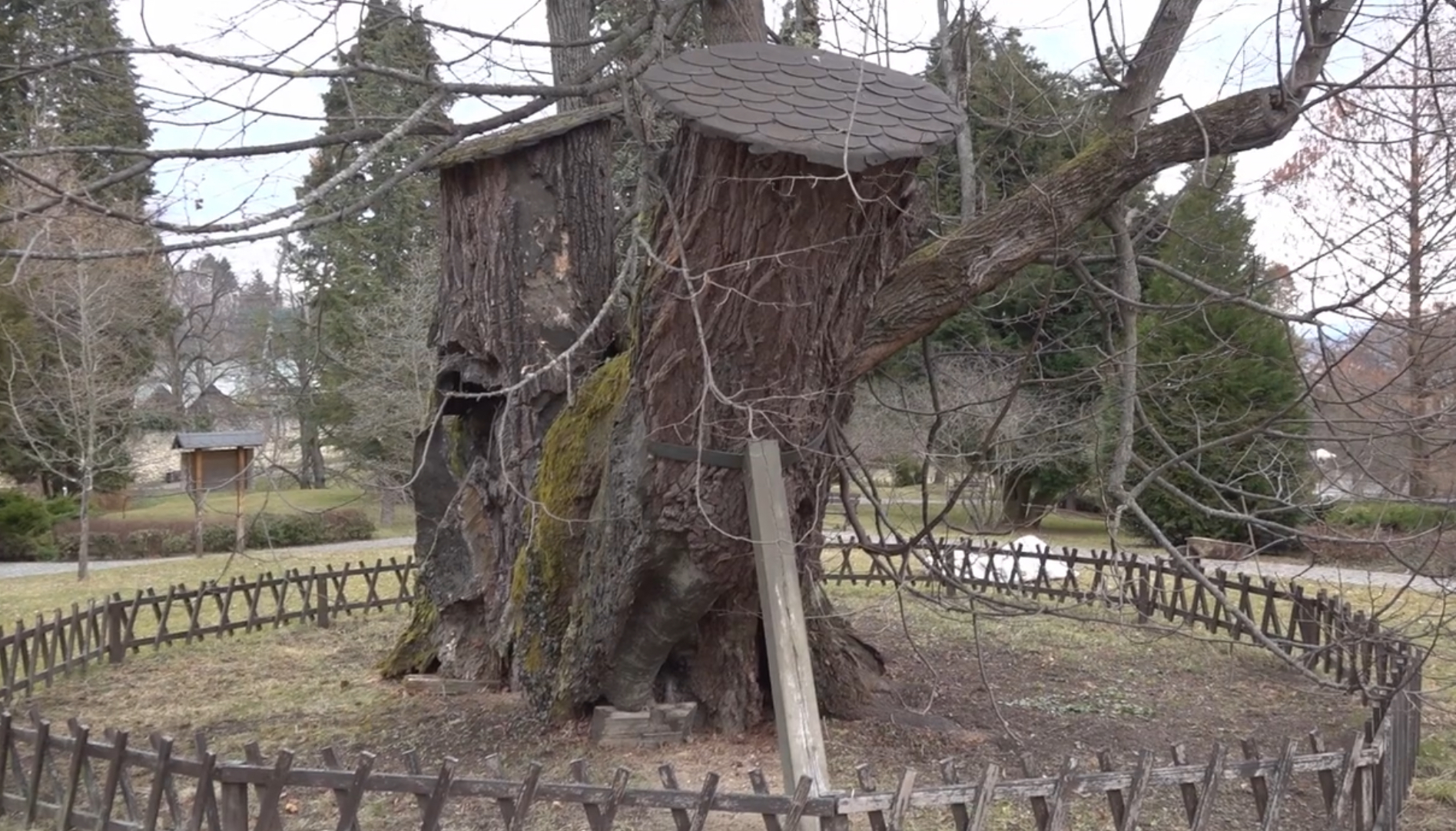
The tree's stump.

The trunk circumference is 11 m, the tree's stump height is 9 m, and the crown diameter is 5 m. It's circumference at the stump is 12.5 m. The Linden is a rare monument and botanically important tree and is protected by the state, alongside 111 other protected individual linden trees in Slovakia.

At its maximum size, the crown attained a diameter of about 36 meters, the primary branches extended to a height of 28 meters, and the trunk's circumference was measured at 12 meters.

== Legal protection and conservation efforts ==
As early as the mid-19th century, the linden tree was surrounded by a wooden railing, later also by a kind of wooden wall with gates. The heavy branches were supported and the branched crown was reinforced with wooden boards. Oak connecting beams (clamps) were to prevent the main trunks or protruding branches from splitting. The local gardeners also treated the cavities created after the branches were broken off.

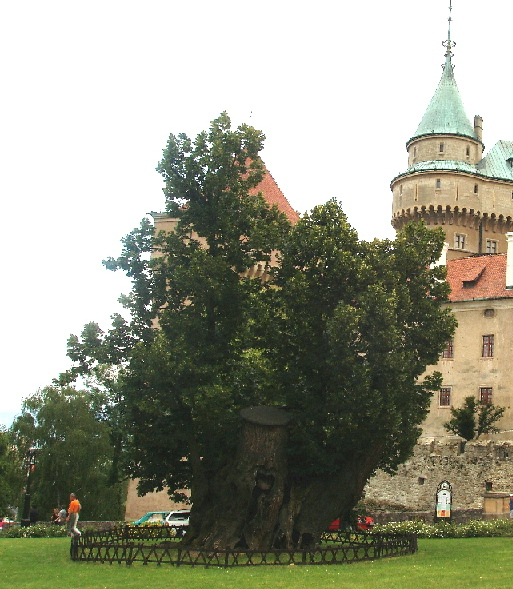
The linden tree with the Bojnice Castle behind it.

In 1952, the castle authorities began the treatment of the tree. Work on the conservation of the linden tree continued during the early spring months of 1953. All the clay from the trunk cavity was removed, in the amount of about 4 wagons. All of the cavity all the rotten and rotted wood was removed, as well as the living wood attacked by insect larvae, especially the giant larvae of carpenter bees, of which there were more than 35 species. Clean river sand was put onto the cleaned bottom of the cavity extending to the roots below ground level, leaving the rest of the cavity free. All the holes were covered with boards and was closed waterproofly with a 10–20 cm layer of asphalt concrete. Everything was sealed covered with lime bark. According to the memorials, the freshly treated and preserved King Matthias's Lime Tree began to develop very vigorously in the spring of 1953, right from the beginning of the growing season.

In 1969, the ancient linden was designated as a protected natural site by the state authorities. Nearly twenty years later, Roman Vacho launched a project aimed at saving the linden again. By 1997, the tree was successfully preserved. The trunk was treated with a preservative, and the larger branches were encouraged to continue growing, allowing the tree to survive. Since that time, only measures to combat wood-decaying fungi and insects have been required.

== See also ==
- List of individual trees
- List of oldest trees
- Wikimedia Commons has media related to Linden tree of King Matthias
