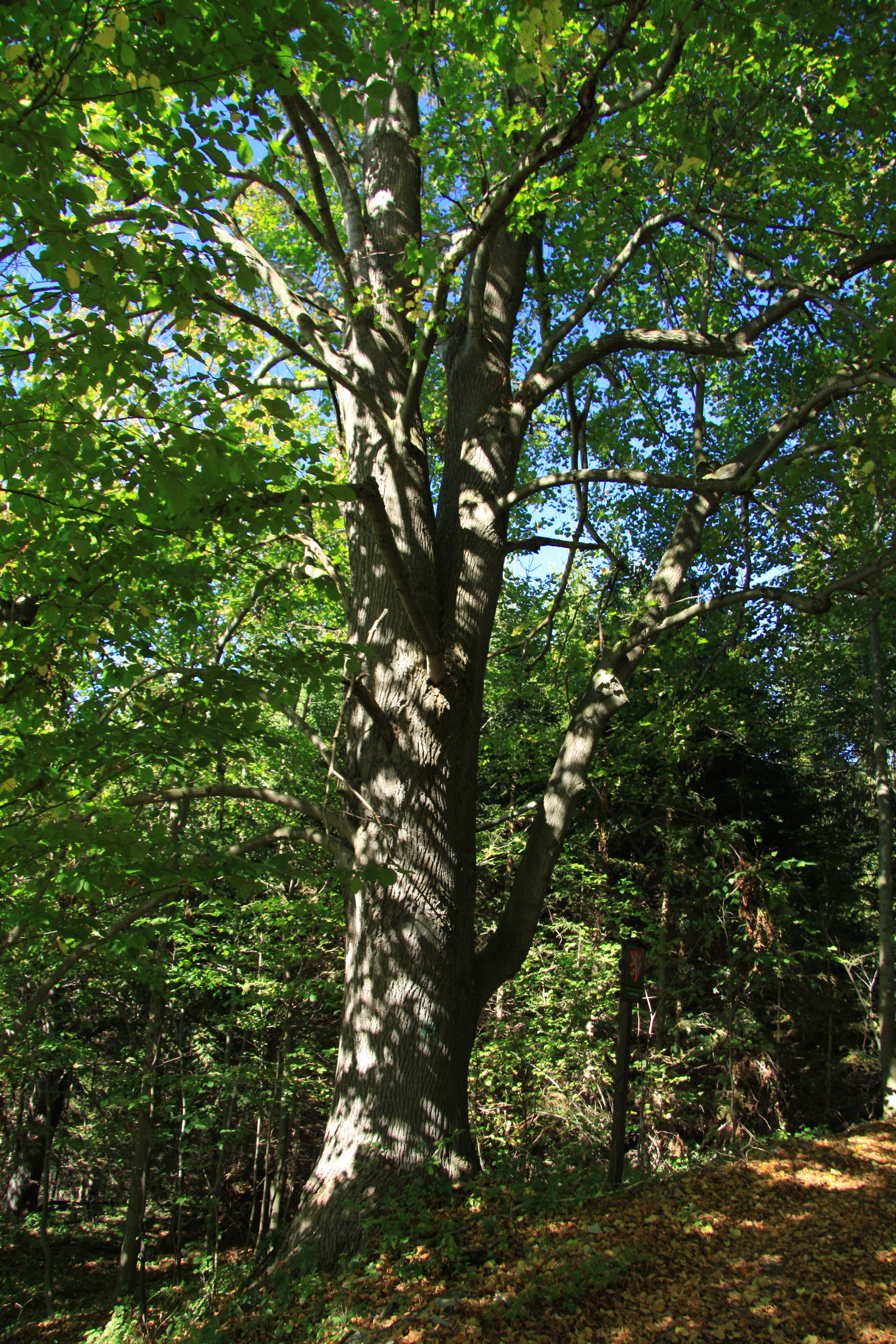
- Specimen in Prachatice District, Czech Republic

Conservation status
- Least Concern (IUCN 3.1)

Scientific classification
- Kingdom: Plantae
- Clade: Tracheophytes
- Clade: Angiosperms
- Clade: Eudicots
- Clade: Rosids
- Order: Malvales
- Family: Malvaceae
- Genus: Tilia
- Species: T. platyphyllos

Binomial name
- Tilia platyphyllos Scop.
- Distribution map

Synonyms
- Tilia grandifolia Ehrh.

= Tilia platyphyllos =

Species of tree

Tilia platyphyllos, the large-leaved lime, broad-leaved lime, or large-leaved linden, is a species of flowering plant in the family Malvaceae (Tiliaceae). It is a deciduous tree, native to much of continental Europe including southwestern Great Britain, typically growing on limestone-derived soils. It is not native in Scotland or Ireland, but is naturalised there. The name "lime", possibly a corruption of "line" originally from "lind", has been in use for centuries and also attaches to other species of Tilia. It is not, however, closely related to the lime fruit tree, a species of citrus. The specific epithet platyphyllos (Greek: πλατύφυλλος) means "with broad leaves" in Greek.

== Taxonomy ==
The species was described by the Italian botanist Giovanni Antonio Scopoli from Carniola, now part of Slovenia. Five subspecies are currently accepted by the Plants of the World Online; they differ mainly in detail of leaf pubescence, with some geographical segregation; three are widespread, the other two more localised:

- Tilia platyphyllos subsp. platyphyllos — widespread, but mainly in the more southern areas of the species distribution. Leaves glabrous above, with simple hairs below.
- Tilia platyphyllos subsp. cordifolia (Besser) C.K.Schneid. — widespread, but mainly in the more northern areas of the species distribution, including England. Leaves with short, simple hairs sparsely (2–4 mm−2) on the upper surface, and simple hairs densely on the lower surface.
- Tilia platyphyllos subsp. corinthiaca (Bosc ex K.Koch) Pigott — Balkans, Turkey.
- Tilia platyphyllos subsp. pseudorubra C.K.Schneid. — widespread, but mainly in the more western areas of the species distribution. Leaves glabrous both above and below.
- Tilia platyphyllos subsp. sitnensis (Kmet) Domin — endemic to Slovakia.

== Description ==
Tilia platyphyllos is a narrowly domed tree with a moderate growth rate, and can eventually attain a height of 40 metres (130 ft), though more typically 20–25 m tall when open-grown away from other trees. The reddish-brown young stems later develop dark grey bark with fine fissures and furrows. The branches spread upwards at wide angles. The twigs are reddish-green and slightly pubescent. The foliage consists of simple, alternately arranged leaves. As indicated by its common name, this tree has larger leaves than the related Tilia cordata (small-leaved lime), 6 to 9 cm (exceptionally 15 cm) long and broad. They are ovate to cordate, mid to dark green above and below, with white downy hair on the underside (except in subsp. pseudorubra), particularly along the veins, tapering into a mucronate tip. The margin is sharply serrate, and the base cordate; the venation is pinnate along a midrib. The pubescent petiole is usually 3–4 cm long, but can vary between 1.5–5 cm. The autumn foliage is yellow-green to yellow.

The small, fragrant, yellowish-white flowers are arranged in drooping, cymose clusters in groups of 3 to 4. Their whitish-green, leaf-like bracts have an oblong-obovate shape. The geniculate peduncles are between 1.5–3 cm long. The hermaphroditic flowers have 5 sepals and 5 petals, numerous stamens, but no staminodes. The superior ovary is 2–10 locular with one smooth style. The flowers are pollinated by bees and some butterflies, notably the White-letter Hairstreak attracted by the copious nectar the species produces, in contrast to T. cordata.The fruit is a round greenish-grey nutlet, 9–12 mm long by 8–10 mm diameter; it has a woody shell with five prominent ridges (which distinguish it from all other limes except Tilia chinensis), and is usually tomentose between the ridges.

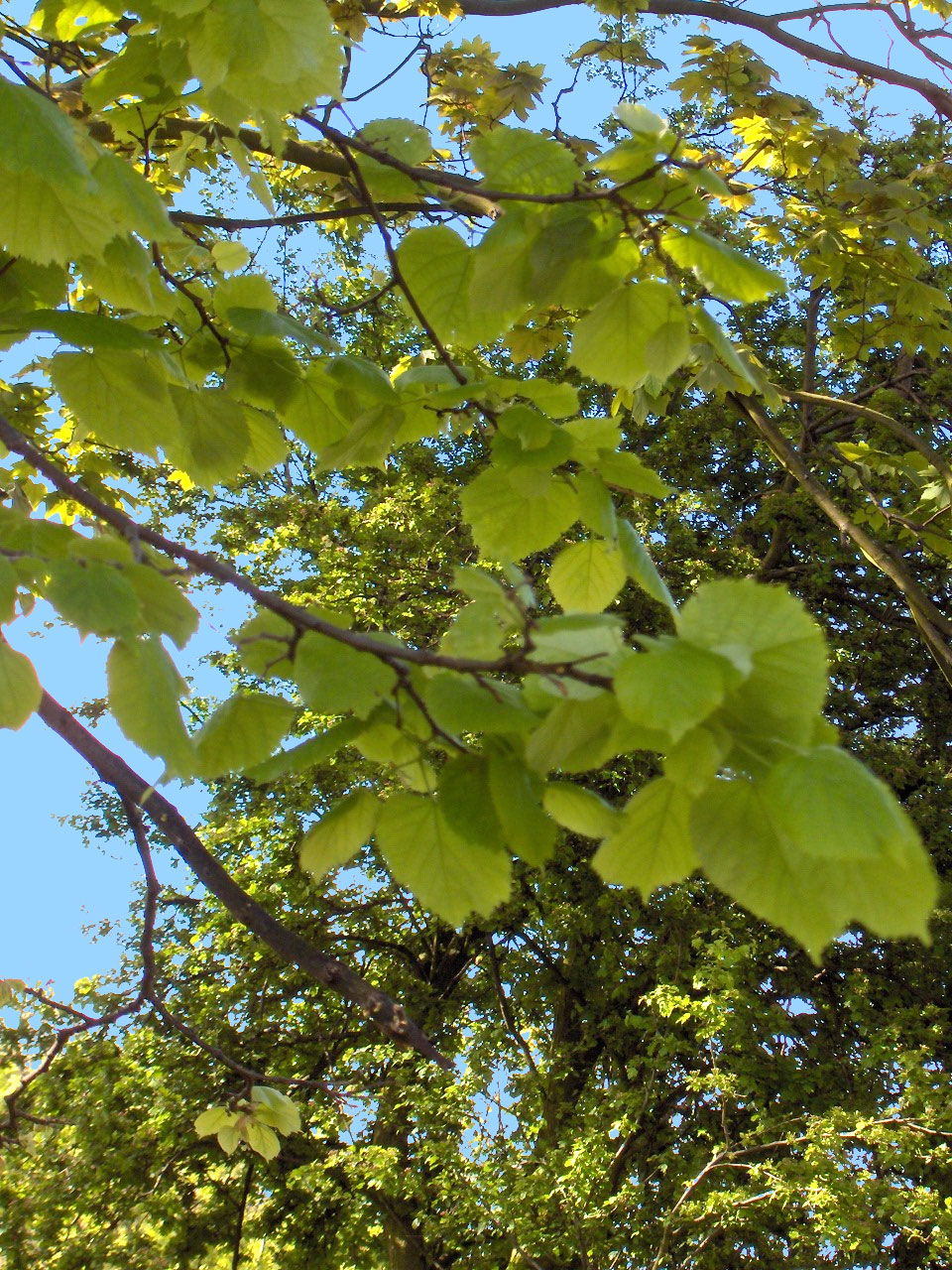
Leaves

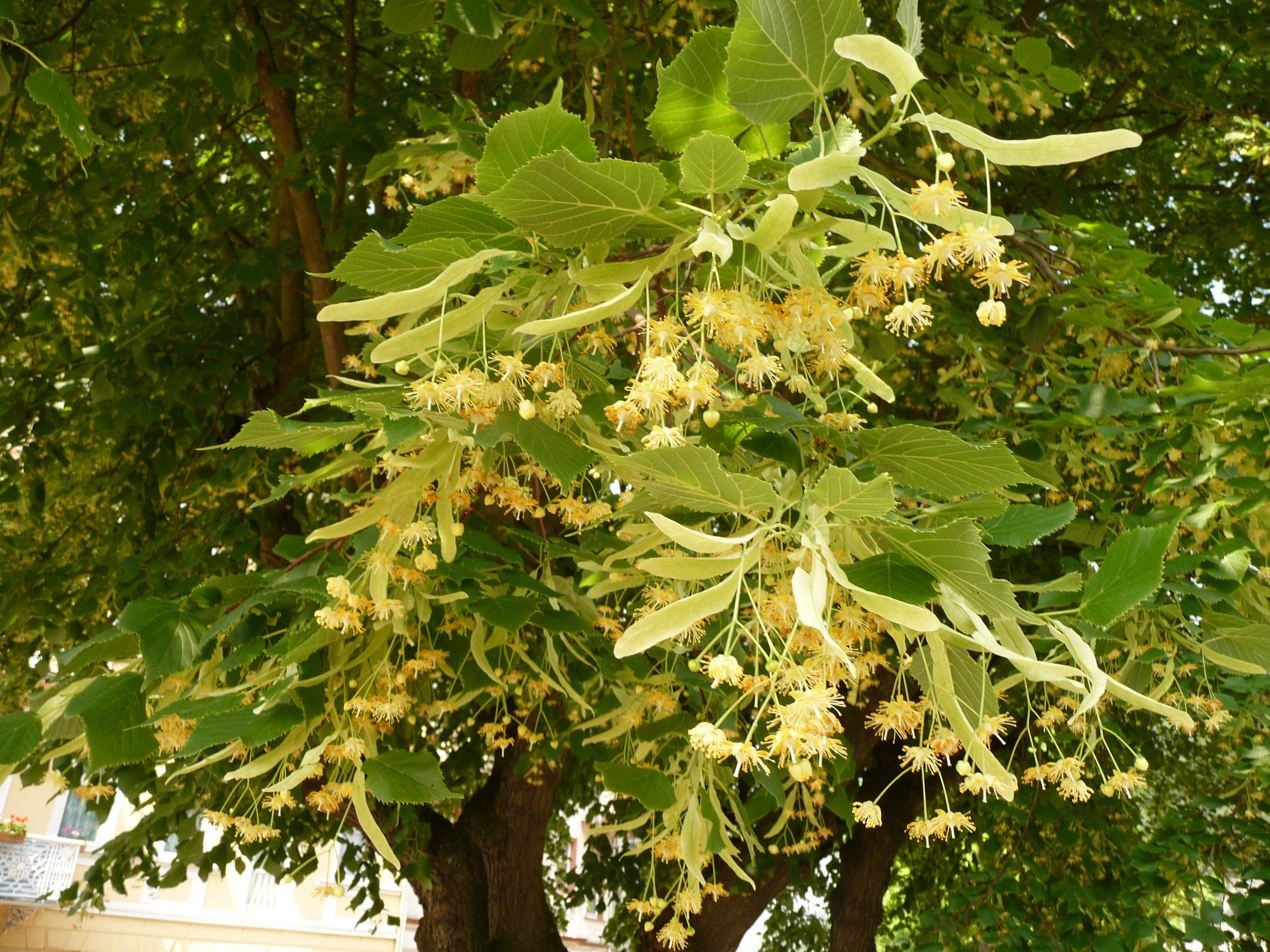
Flowers

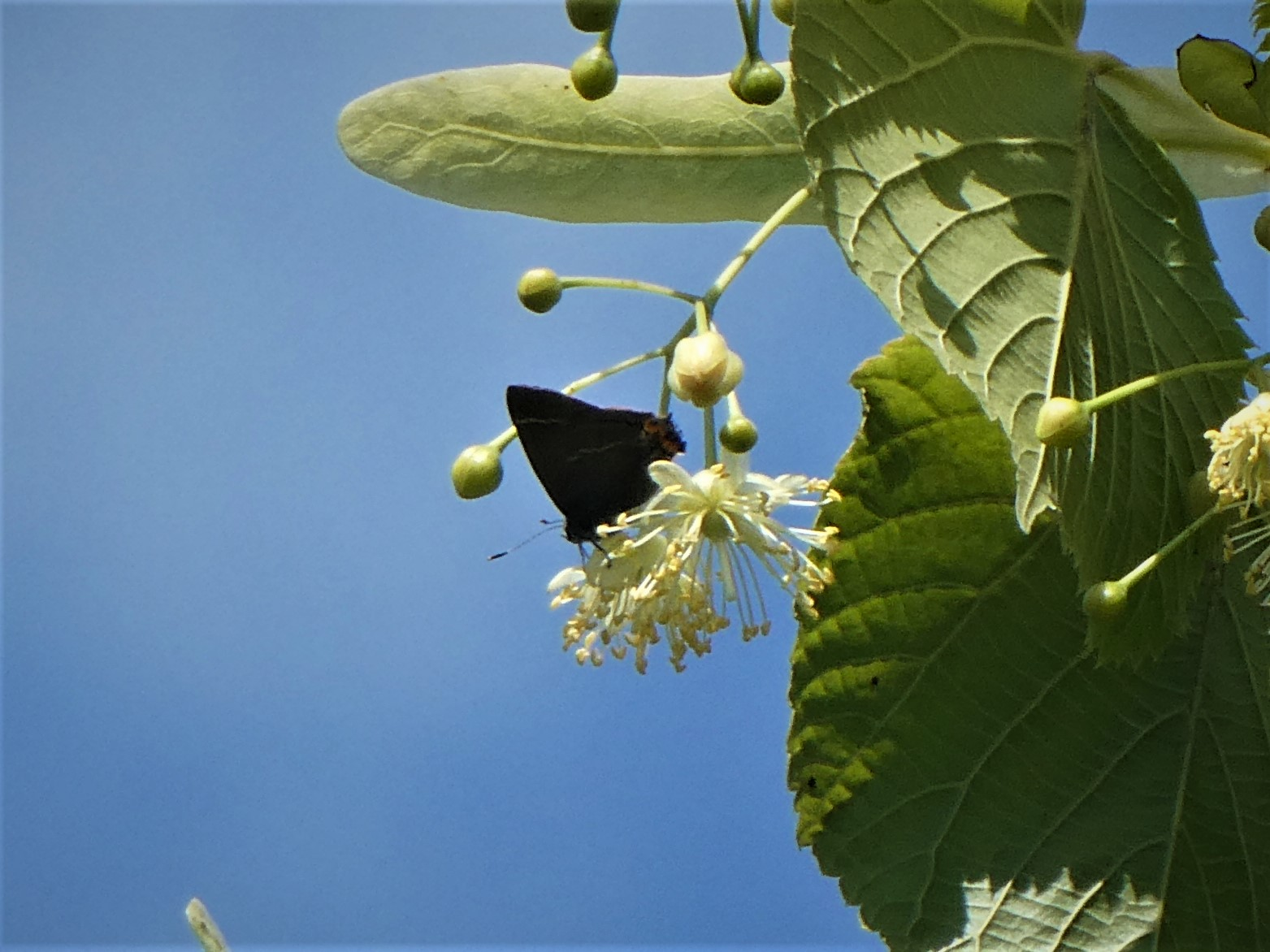
White-letter hairstreak nectaring on T. platyphyllos flower

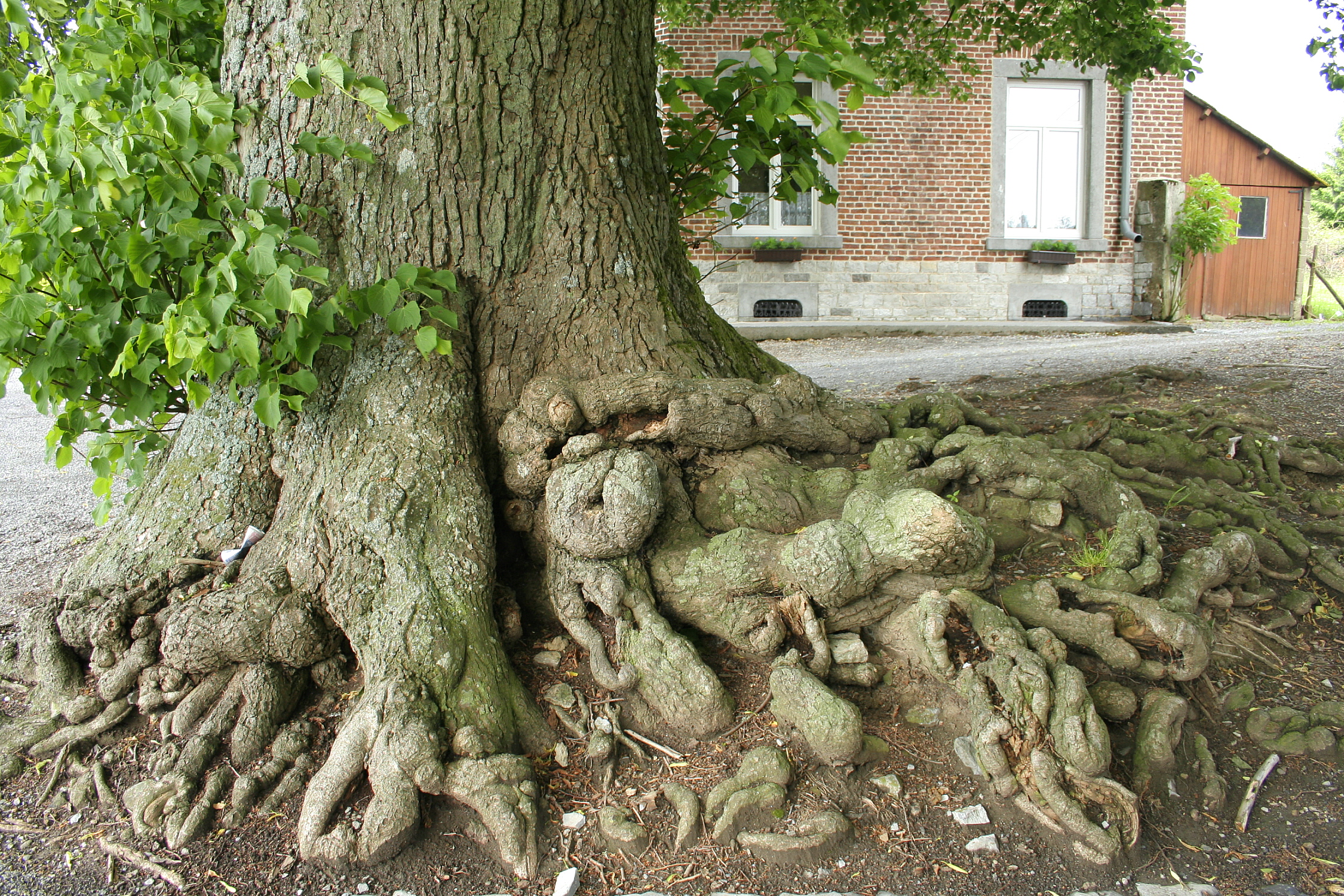
Roots

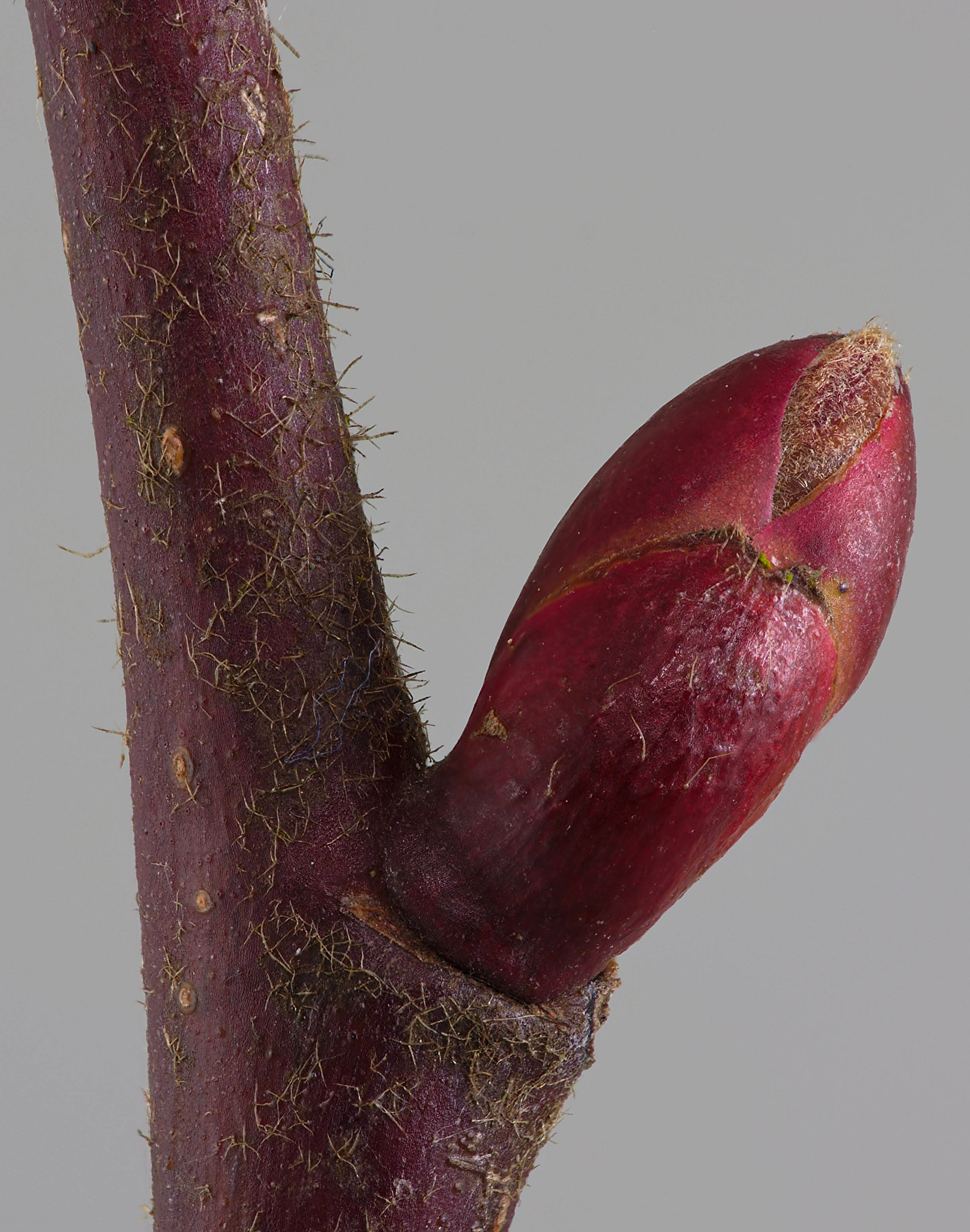
Vegetative bud starting to open

== Cultivation ==
Tilia platyphyllos is widely planted throughout the temperate world as an ornamental tree in parks and city streets. Numerous cultivars are available, including 'Aurea', (golden leafed), 'Fastigiata', 'Laciniata' (seemingly torn leaves), 'Örebro' (columnar), 'Princes Street' (narrow crown), 'Rubra' (red twigged), 'Tortuosa' (twisted branches), and 'Tiltstone Filigree' (upswept branches). The cultivar 'Rubra' has gained the Royal Horticultural Society's Award of Garden Merit.

== Hybrids ==
Tilia platyphyllos readily hybridises with Tilia cordata, the hybrid being the common lime T. × europaea (syn. T. × vulgaris).

== Fossil record ==
Fossils of Tilia platyphyllos have been described from the fossil flora of Kızılcahamam district in Turkey, which is of early Pliocene age.

== Use ==
Tilia wood is used for carving, and almost all parts of the tree can be used for fodder, ropes or firewood. Bast and honey, which were historically the main products of Tilia, may have been an important factor in the spread of the species and its status as a typical agroforestry tree in the Middle Ages. Tilia spp. are also important for amenity use, shelterbelts and game plantings in the open landscape, in urban areas and recreational forestry. The plant also contains tannins that can act as an astringent. The wood is burned to charcoal and ingested for intestinal disorders and used topically for edema or infection, such as cellulitis or of the lower leg.

== Famous trees ==
- 300-year-old T. platyphyllos at Schloss Linderhof Bavaria – known in German as the "Koenigslinde".
- 350-year-old T. platyphyllos at Schloss Holzheim Hesse – known as the "Landgrave's lime".
- 700-year-old T. platyphyllos at Bojnice Castle, Slovakia Linden Tree of King Matthias – known in Slovak as "Bojnická lipa" ("the Bojnice Linden") or "Lipa kráľa Mateja" ("King Matej's Linden").
- 550-year-old T. platyphyllos in Bracon, Jura, France – planted to mark the marriage of Marie de Bourgogne to Maximilian I of the House of Habsburg in Austria in 1477.
- T. platyphyllos in Heeder Linde Park, Heede, Germany 15.39 metres girth.
