= Schloss Holzheim (hunting seat) =

Coordinates: 50°46′52″N 9°40′13″E

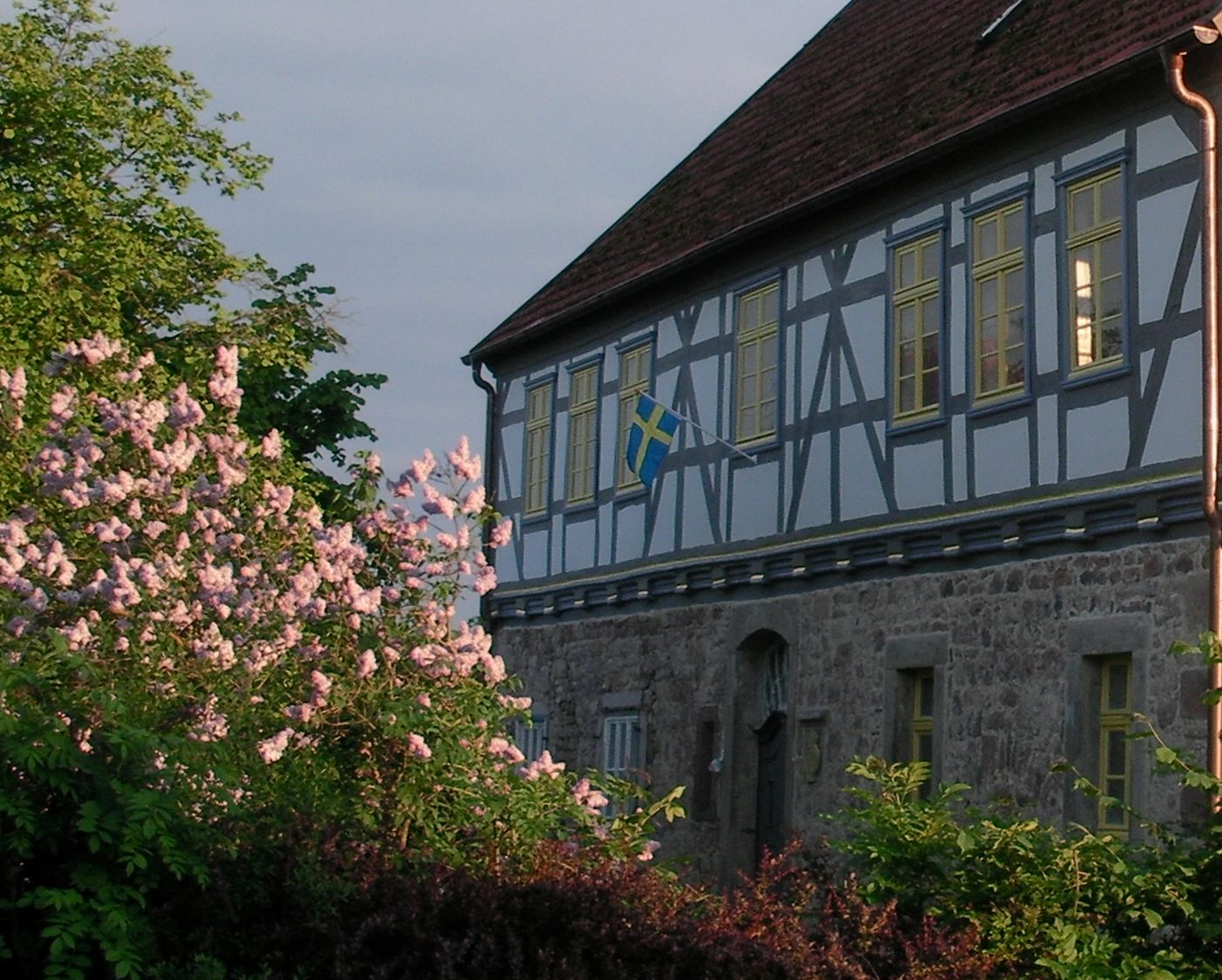
Front of Schloss Holzheim

Schloss Holzheim is a former hunting seat of the ruling family of Hesse-Kassel, located in the village of Holzheim in the German state of Hesse, approximately 80 kilometres (50 mi) south of Kassel. The hunting lodge was built by the architect Charles du Ry between 1732 and 1735 under Frederick I, King of Sweden and also Landgrave of Hesse-Kassel, in baroque style on the medieval foundation walls (from 1183) of the former manor house of the local noble families Von Holzheim and Von Romrod. Frederick's father, Landgrave Charles I, Landgrave of Hesse-Kassel had often come here for hunting. Frederick's brother and governor, Prince William (from 1751 William VIII, Landgrave of Hesse-Kassel), liked to be here as well because of the rich game population of the forest areas around the princely estate.

The building is surrounded by the remains of a Baroque garden (Schlossgarten, or "castle garden"), where many rare and exotic plants grow, including ancient roses, topiary yews, rhododendrons, and exotic trees. The showpiece of the baroque garden is a more-than-350-year-old large-leaved lime (Tilia platyphyllos), called "Landgrave's lime".

Schloss Holzheim is a protected national historical monument.

== Sources ==
- Hessisches Staatsarchiv Marburg (Hessian State Archives in Marburg), Regest-No 7703: "Asmus von Romrod receives Holzheim Castle" (December 30, 1491)
- Dietrich Christoph von Rommel, Geschichte von Hessen, Vierter Teil, erste Abteilung (5th vol), Cassel 1835 (Hamburg, Friedrich Perthes), pp. 429-430
- Rudolf Knappe: Mittelalterliche Burgen in Hessen: 800 Burgen, Burgruinen und Burgstätten. 3rd ed, Wartberg-Verlag, Gudensberg-Gleichen 2000, p. 166 f.
