= Jihlava Zoo =

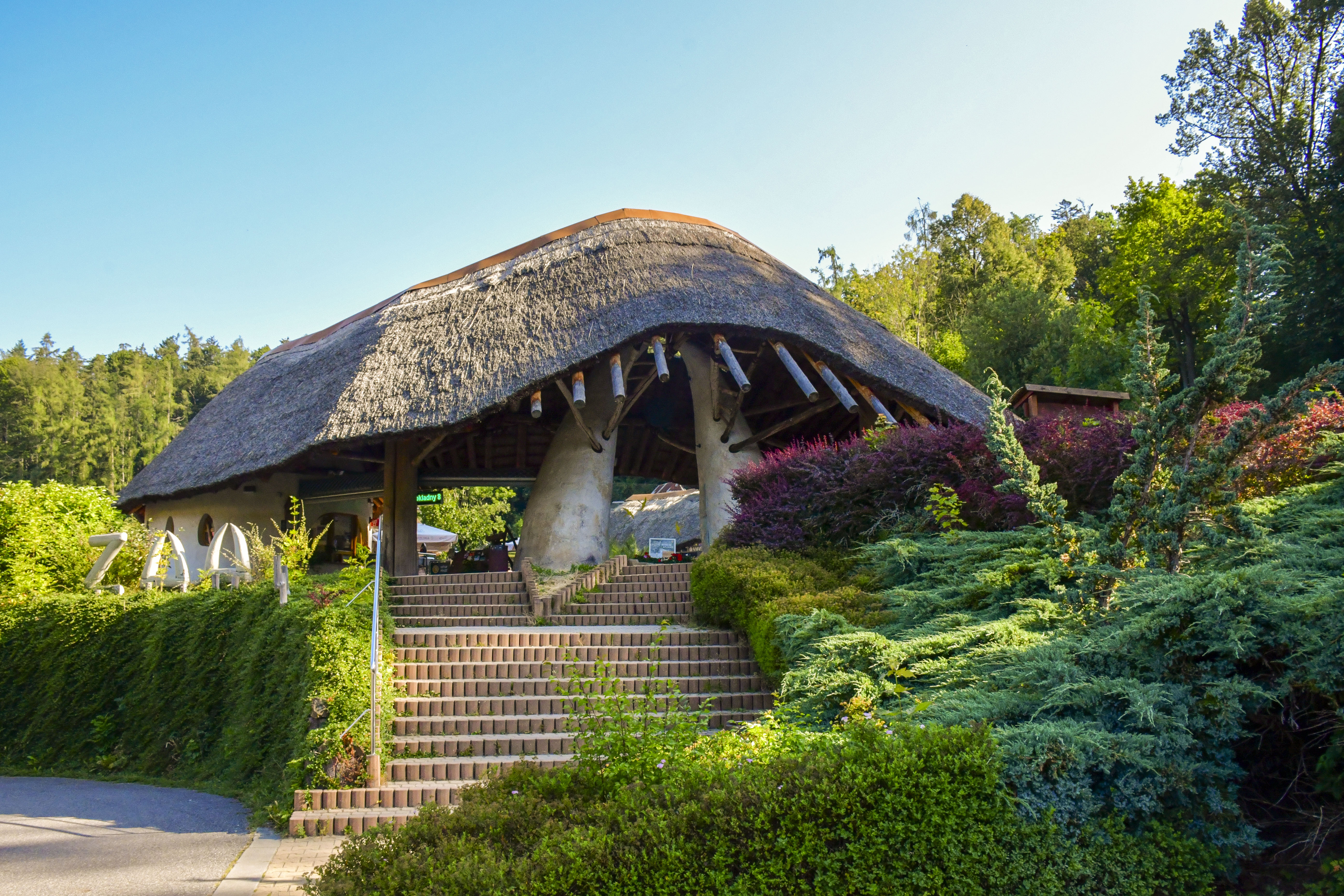
- Entrance
- Interactive map of Jihlava Zoo
- 49°23′48″N 15°35′48″E
- Date opened: 1957
- Location: Březinovy sady 5642/10, 586 01 Jihlava
- Land area: 9 hectares (22 acres)
- No. of animals: 1,300
- No. of species: 260
- Memberships: EAZA, UCSZOO
- Website: zoojihlava.cz

Jihlava Zoo (Czech: Zoologická zahrada Jihlava) is a zoo in Jihlava in the Czech Republic.

== Characteristics ==
Jihlava Zoo is located in a valley of the Jihlávka Stream, and is home to about 260 species of exotic animals, including endangered species. The zoo specializes in breeding of big carnivores, monkeys and reptiles.

== History ==
The predecessor of the Jihlava Zoo was Zookoutek Jihlava, established in 1957. In 1982, it transformed into a zoo.

In 1994, the zoo was accepted as a member of the European Association of Zoos and Aquaria (EAZA).
