= Union of Czech and Slovak Zoological Gardens =

Czech-slovak zoo union

The Union of Czech and Slovak Zoological Gardens (Czech: Unie českých a slovenských zoologických zahrad) is an organization for the community of zoos in the Czech Republic and Slovakia. It was founded in 1990 and comprises 19 member zoos.

== Members ==
The organization comprises 15 member zoos in the Czech Republic and 4 in Slovakia.

Full members
Member	Country	City
Brno Zoo	Czech Republic	Brno
Chomutov Zoo	Czech Republic	Chomutov
Děčín Zoo	Czech Republic	Děčín
Dvůr Králové Zoo	Czech Republic	Dvůr Králové nad Labem
Hodonín Zoo	Czech Republic	Hodonín
Jihlava Zoo	Czech Republic	Jihlava
Liberec Zoo	Czech Republic	Liberec
Ohrada Zoo	Czech Republic	Hluboká nad Vltavou
Olomouc Zoo	Czech Republic	Olomouc
Ostrava Zoo	Czech Republic	Ostrava
Plzeň Zoo	Czech Republic	Plzeň
Prague Zoo	Czech Republic	Prague
Ústí nad Labem Zoo	Czech Republic	Ústí nad Labem
Zlín–Lešná Zoo	Czech Republic	Zlín
Zoopark Vyškov	Czech Republic	Vyškov
Bojnice Zoo	Slovakia	Bojnice
Bratislava Zoo	Slovakia	Bratislava
Košice Zoo	Slovakia	Košice
Spišská Nová Ves Zoo	Slovakia	Spišská Nová Ves

== See also ==
- List of zoo associations
