= Swiss Association of Scientific Zoos =

Swiss zoological association

- zooschweiz/zoosuisse
- Logo of zooschweiz/zoosuisse
- Abbreviation: SASZ
- Type: Zoological organisation
- Location: Switzerland
- Official language: German / French
- Parent organization: World Association of Zoos and Aquariums
- Website: zoos.ch

The Swiss Association of Scientific Zoos, or zooschweiz/zoosuisse, is the zoological association responsible for the operation of zoos in Switzerland.

The full name is: zooschweiz - Verein wissenschaftlich geleiteter zoologischer Gärten der Schweiz / zoosuisse - Association des parcs zoologiques suisses gérés de façon scientifique ((German)Zooschweiz/(French)Zoosuisse - Association of scientifically managed swiss zoological parks).

Zooschweiz/zoosuisse is a member of Verband der Zoologischen Gärten, which is in turn affiliate to WAZA.

The mission of the association is to make a contribution to the biodiversity of the Earth, through the conservation of animal species and their habitats.

The association currently handles the management of nine zoos:

- Basel Zoo
- Tierpark Bern
- Nature and Animal Park Goldau
- Knie's Kinderzoo
- La Garenne
- Papiliorama in Kerzers
- Zurich Zoo
- Wildnispark Zurich, Langenberg
- Walter Zoo, Gossau

== See also ==
- List of zoo associations
