= Bojnice Zoo =

Slovak National Zoological Garden Národná zoologická záhrada Bojnice
- Bojnice Zoo logo

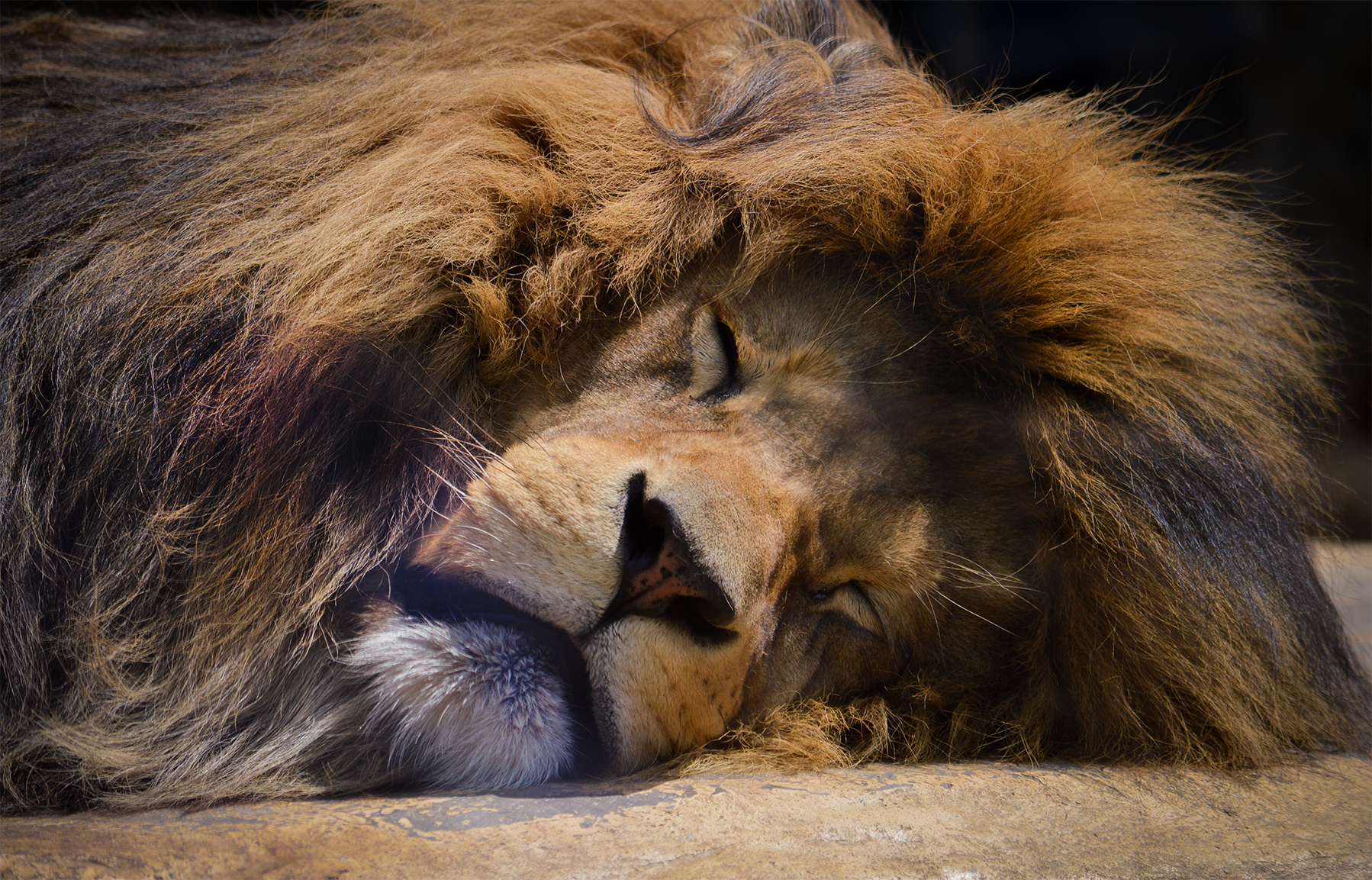
- Northern lion at the Bojnice Zoo
- Interactive map of Slovak National Zoological Garden; Národná zoologická záhrada Bojnice
- 48°46′50″N 18°34′37″E
- Date opened: 1 April 1955; 71 years ago
- Location: Bojnice, Slovakia
- Land area: 42 ha (100 acres)
- No. of animals: >2700 (2022)
- No. of species: >360 (2022)
- Annual visitors: 403,000 (2018)
- Memberships: IUCN, WAZA, EAZA, UCSZOO, IZA, Species360
- Website: zoobojnice.sk

The Slovak National Zoological Garden (Slovak: Národná zoologická záhrada Bojnice) is a 42-hectare (100-acre) zoo in the town of Bojnice, Slovakia. It is the oldest and most visited of Slovak zoos, being established in 1955. The zoo received more than 400,000 visitors in the year 2018.

As of 2022, it presents over 360 different species, with a total of over 2700 specimens. Its primary attractions include the African elephant and Carpathian lynx. It is the only zoo in Slovakia with species such as the agile wallaby, Hamlyn's monkey, African palm civet, red-fan parrot and more.

The Bojnice Zoo is managed by the ministry of environment of the Slovak Republic.

== History ==
Opened on 1 April 1955, it is the first zoo to ever open in Slovakia. Initially called the Zoological Garden of the Nitra Region (Slovak: Zoologická záhrada Nitrianskeho kraja v Bojniciach), administration of the zoo was later transferred to the ministry of environment in 1998. Only much later, in 2017, was the zoo named the Slovak National Zoological Garden.

== Associations ==
The Bojnice Zoo is a member of the International Union for Conservation of Nature (IUCN), the World Association of Zoos and Aquariums (WAZA), the European Association of Zoos and Aquaria (EAZA), the Union of Czech and Slovak Zoological Gardens (UCSZOO), the International Zoo Educators Association (IZA), the Species360 organization, the EUROLYNX organization, the West African Primate Conservation Action organization and the European Elephant Keeper and Manager Association.

== Collection ==
Number of species as showcased on official website
Group	Number of species
Mammals	75
Birds	131
Reptiles	16
Amphibians	10
Fish	34
Invertebrates	3
"Other"	25
Total	294

The Bojnice Zoo is home to the largest collection of animals of any Slovak zoo, many of which are also only showcased there. This includes, but is not limited to, the African elephant and bongo antelope.

The zoo also offers patrons the option to symbolic 'adopt' any of their animals for a fee, which supports the zoo financially.

Photo gallery

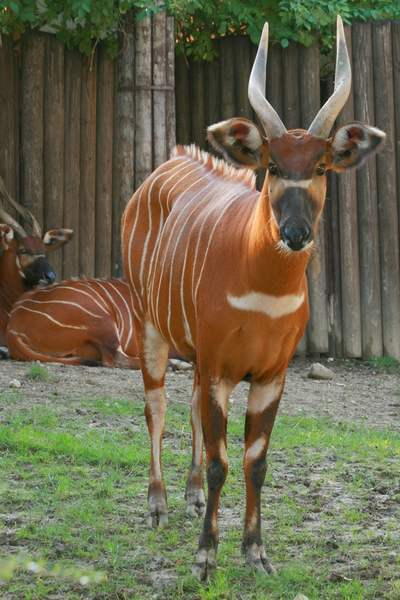
Bongo antilope

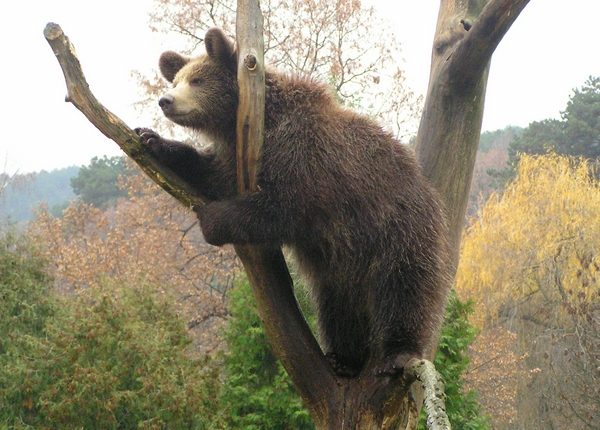
Brown bear

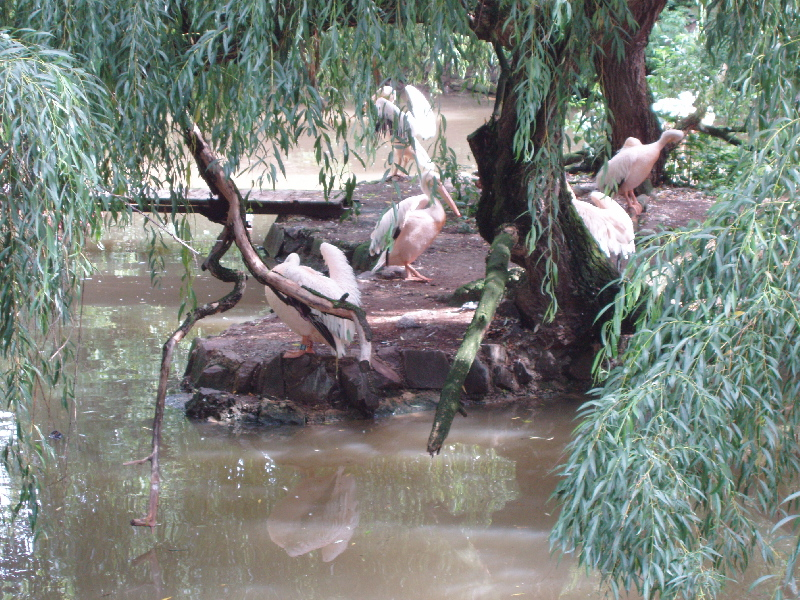
Flamingo

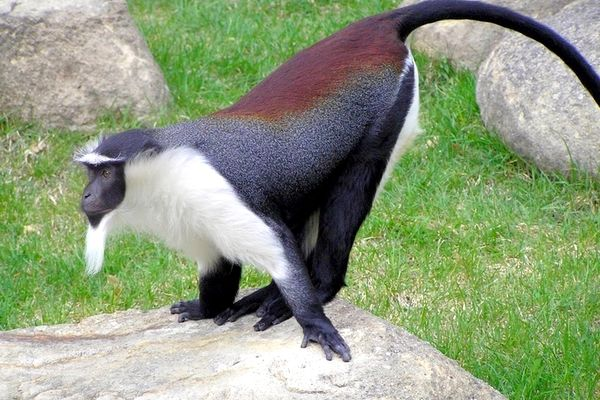
Roloway monkey

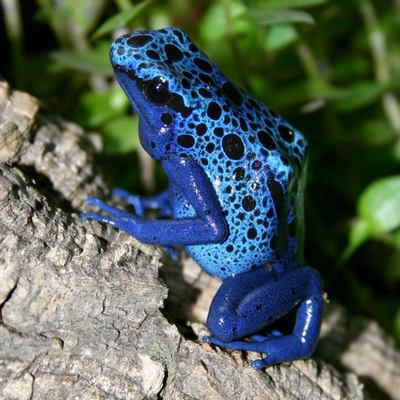
Blue poison dart frog

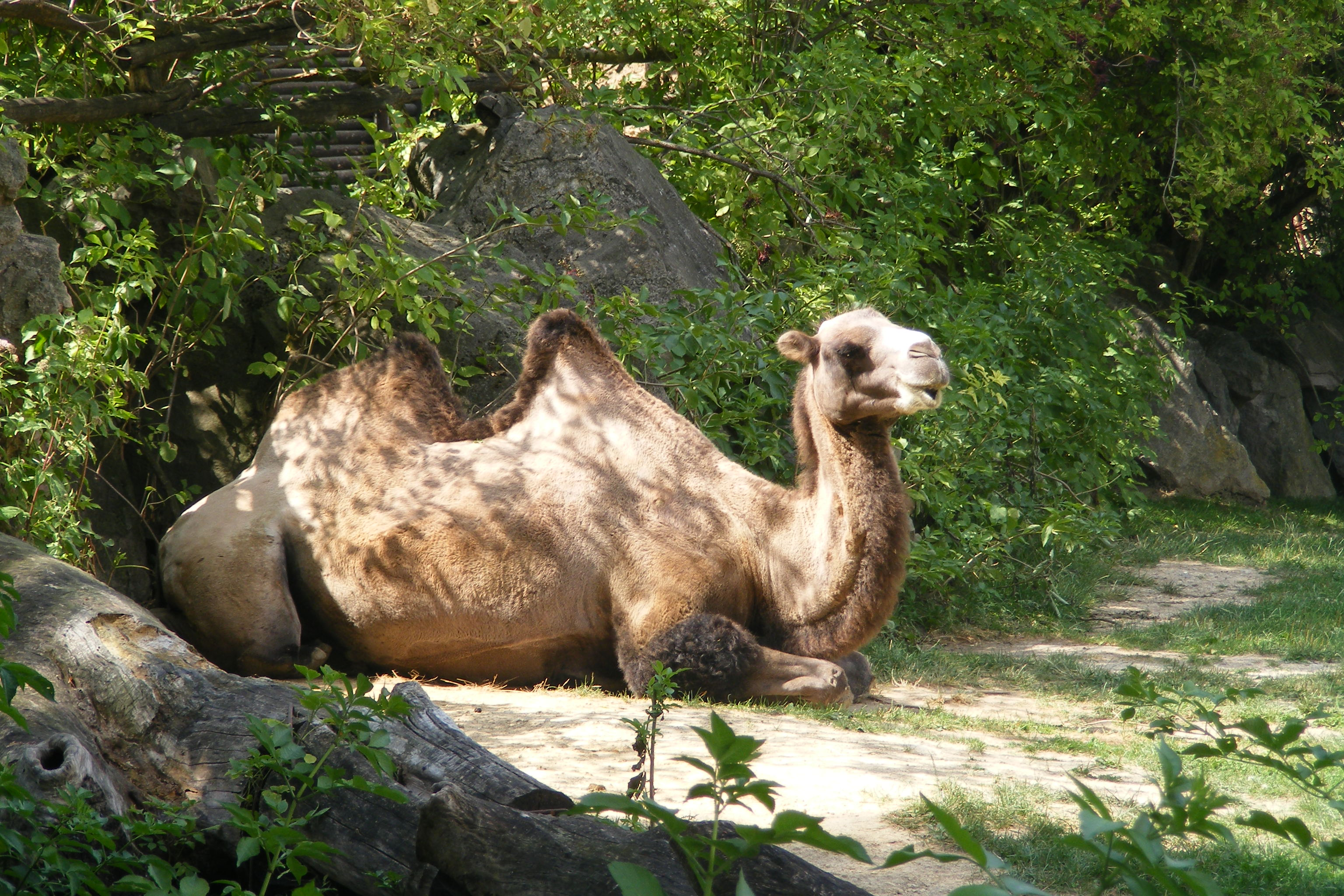
Camel

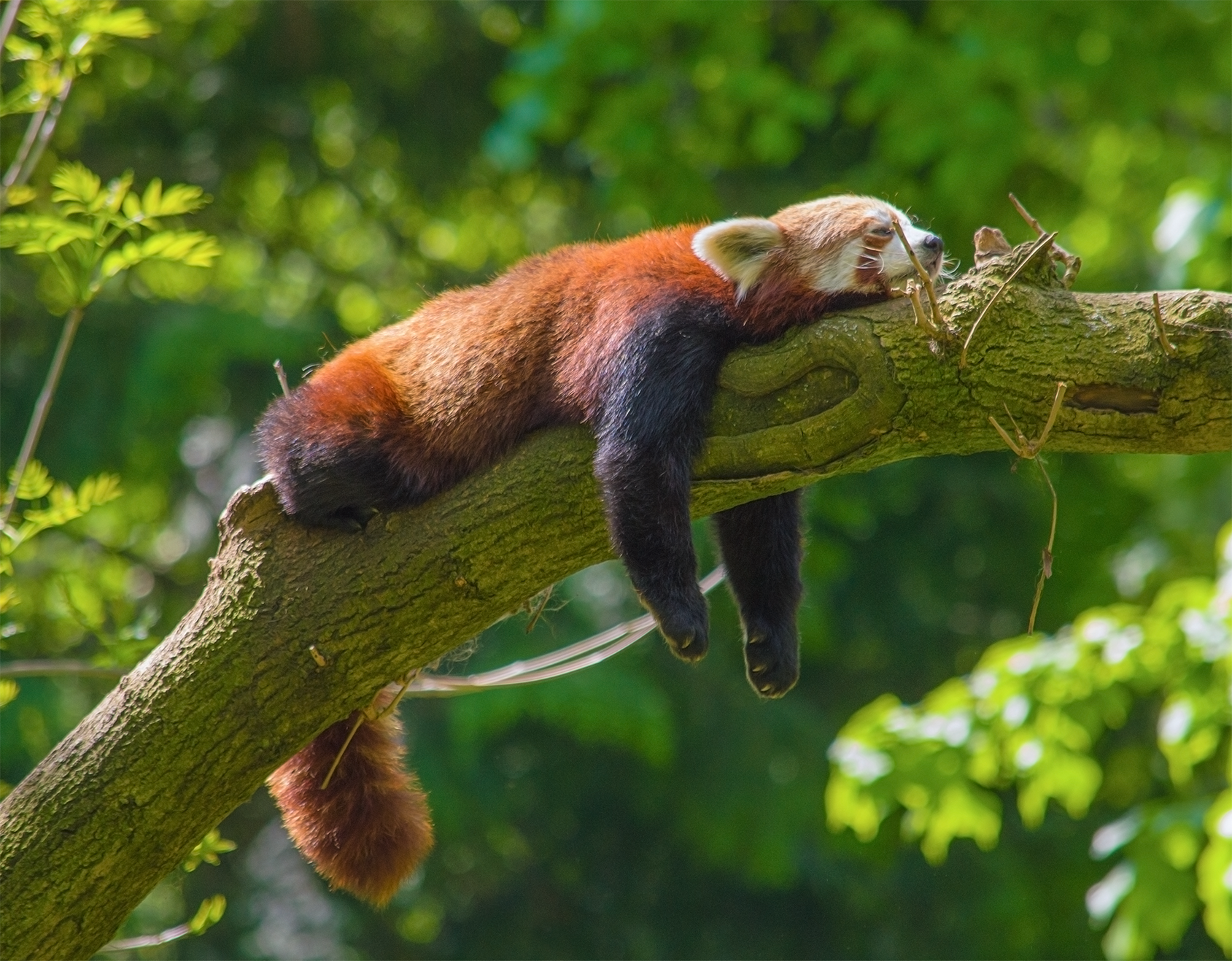
Red panda

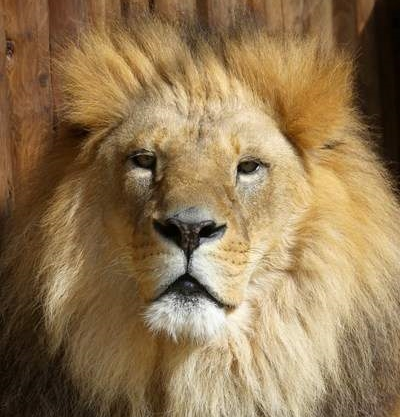
Lion
