= Bojnice Castle =

Medieval castle in Bojnice, Slovakia

Coordinates: 48°46′48″N 18°34′40″E

- Bojnický zámok
- Bojnice; Slovakia
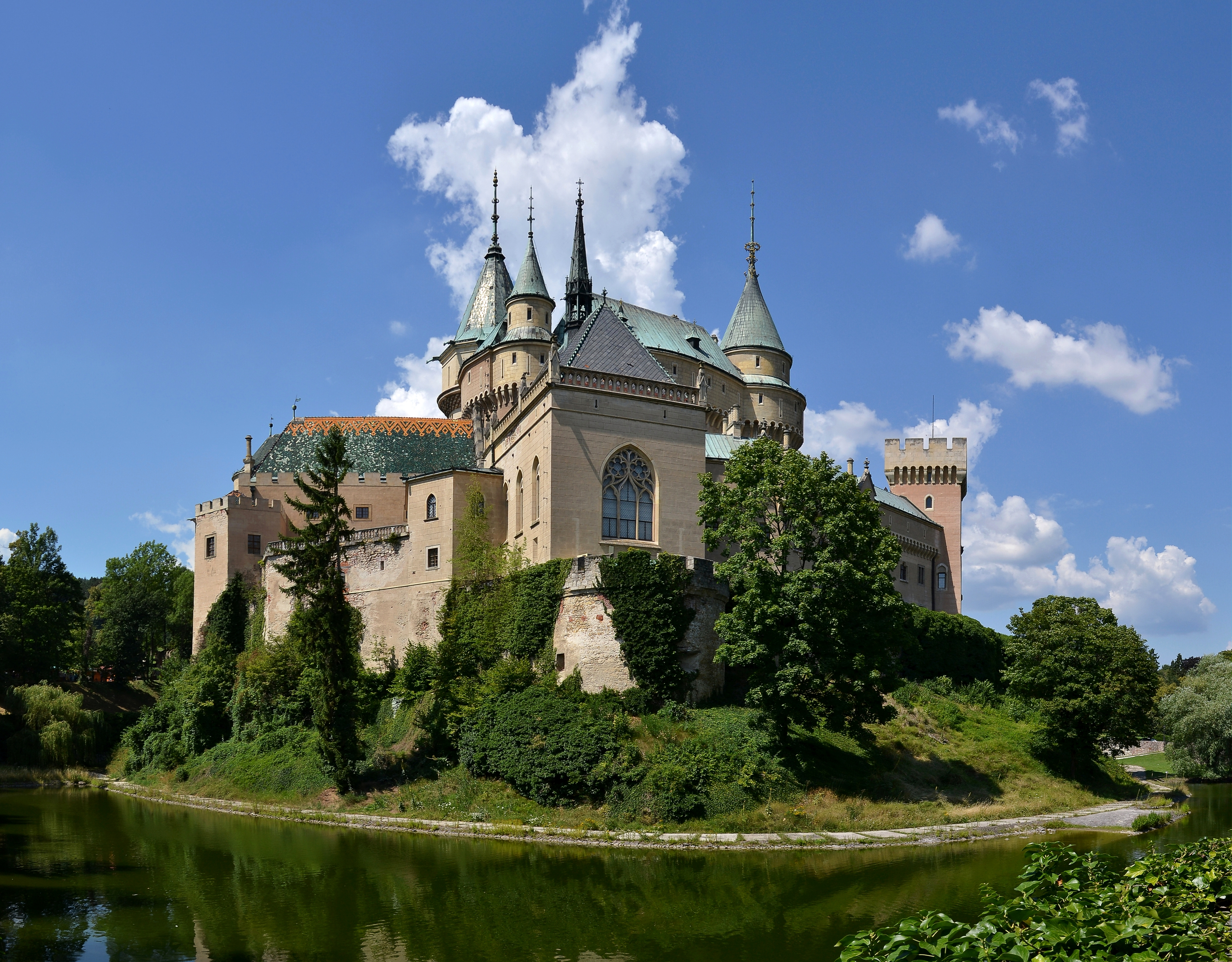

Site information
- Type: Castle
- Owner: Slovak Republic
- Controlled by: Kingdom of Hungary (from 12th century until 1920), Czechoslovakia (from 1920 until 1993), Slovakia (since 1993)
- Open to the public: Yes, opening hours apply to the museum and guided tours
- Condition: Completely reconstructed after fire in 1950

Location
- Location within Slovakia
- Location within Slovakia

Site history
- Built: 12th century Rebuilt in 1889–1910
- Events: Notable events in the castle's life: 1528, major reconstruction after it was acquired by the Thurzó family

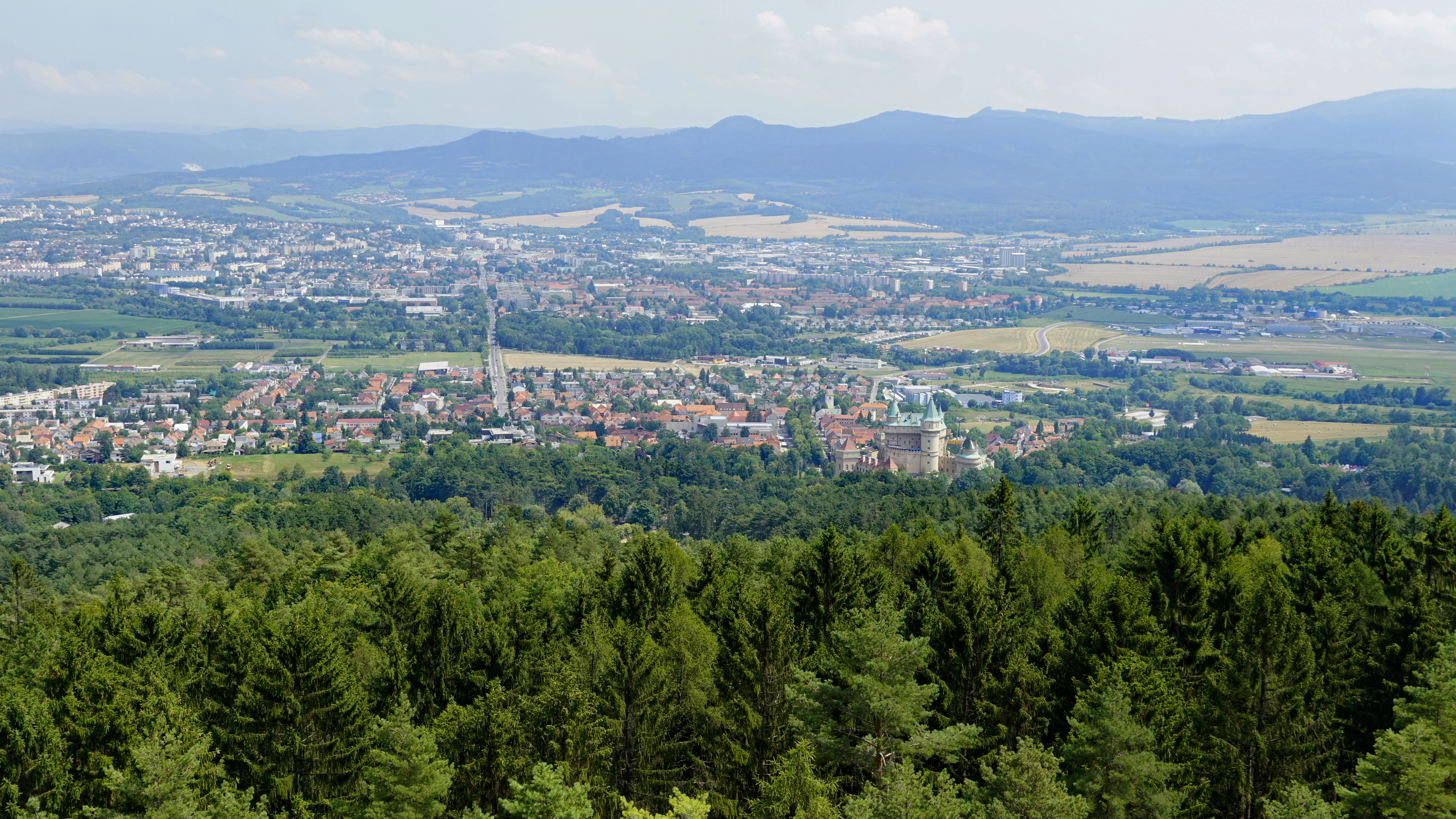
Bojnice Castle, 2019

Bojnice Castle (Slovak: Bojnický zámok, Hungarian: Bajmóci vár) is a medieval castle in Bojnice, Slovakia. It is a Romanesque castle with some original Gothic and Renaissance elements built in the 12th century. Bojnice Castle is one of the most visited castles in Slovakia, receiving hundreds of thousands of visitors every year and also being a popular filming stage for fantasy and fairy-tale movies. It was owned by Hungarian kings and nobleman from the 12th century until the territory became part of Czechoslovakia after the Treaty of Trianon in 1920 and was acquired by a Czech entrepreneur in 1939.

== History ==
Bojnice Castle was first mentioned in written records in 1113, in a document held at the Zobor Abbey. Originally built as a wooden fort, it was gradually replaced by stone, with the outer walls being shaped according to the uneven rocky terrain. Its first owner was Hungarian nobleman Matthew III Csák, who received it in 1302 from the King Wenceslaus of Hungary. Later, in the 15th century, it was owned by King Matthias Corvinus of Hungary, who gave it to his illegitimate son John Corvinus in 1489. Matthias liked to visit Bajmóc and it was here that he worked on his royal decrees. He used to dictate them under a linden tree, which is now known as the Linden tree of King Matthias. After his death the castle became the property of the Zápolya family (see John Zápolya), a Hungarian noble family. The Thurzós, the richest family in the northern Kingdom of Hungary, acquired the castle in 1528 and undertook its major reconstruction. The former fortress was turned into a Renaissance castle. From 1646 on, the castle's owners were the Pálfis, who continued to rebuild the castle.

Finally, the last famous castle owner from the Pálffy family, Hungarian Count János Ferenc Pálffy (1829–1908), made a complex romantic reconstruction from 1888 to 1910 and created today's imitation of French castles of the Loire valley. He not only built the castle, but also was the architect and interior designer. He utilized his artistic taste and love for collecting art pieces. He was one of the greatest collectors of antiques, tapestries, drawings, paintings, and sculptures of his time.

The museum was established by previous owner, Count János Pálffy, in his 1907 will. He expressed his wish that the castle be made available to the public and that the works of art remain in their original places and be viewed by all interested parties. However, János Pálffy's heirs contested the will in court as they sold off the valuable and used the Bojnice estate as an economic base. While the castle's management has allowed tours of its grounds and interior, only part of the proceeds from the sale went to preserving in the castle through an agreement between the heirs and the Czechoslovak state. That agreement sheltered much of the collection, specifying that it could not be sold at private auction and remained in the ownership of the state.In 1941, the administration of Bojnice Manor allowed the Upper Nitra Museum Association to place its archaeological, ethnographic, ethnological, and historical collections on castle grounds, in the Winter Garden.

Fire broke out on 9 May 1950, which destroyed all the towers of the Middle Bojnice Castle. The Bojnice Local National Committee requested support from the Communist National Committee (KNV) to restore the castle with a museum on its premises. The KNV in Nitra agreed and established The Regional Museum of Local History at Bojnice Castle through resolution no. 107/1950 on 7 September 1950. Reconstruction was completed by the autumn of 1951 with the first exhibition in the renovated castle opening on 2 September 1951. As a regional institution, it was given an advisory role for museums throughout the region until a territorial reorganization in 1960. The museum ended its advisory role and transitioned to a research and documentation center focusing on the Upper Ponitrie. Additionally, as part of the new network of museums, it was designated as the official local history museum for the Prievidza District. In 1969, the Museum in Bojnice was incorporated directly under the Ministry of Culture of the Slovak Socialist Republic, then the Central Administration of Museums and Galleries in Bratislava. Bojnice Castle was declared a national cultural monument in 1970.

After the Dissolution of Czechoslovakia, the Bojnice museum was reorganized again, now managed as an independent museum by the Slovak National Museum (SNM) in Bratislava.

== Description ==
The castle is renowned for its attractions, including the popular Castle Fairytale, the International Festival of Ghosts and Spirits and the Summer Music Festival. The romantic castle is also a popular location for filming fairy tale movies, such as Fantaghirò. It hosts Slovakia's single most popular museum and has been featured in many movies.

=== Travertine cave ===
A natural travertine cave with a diameter of 22 m and a height of 6 m is located 26 meters below the Bojnice's 4th courtyard. The cave was formed by millennia of precipitation. Water flowed through fissures into the center of the travertine pile, creating the cavern. The cave features two ponds in the cave, connected to others in other underground spaces. Evidence suggests that ancient inhabitants of the region and castle knew about the cave, using it as a shelter and water reservoir. However, somehow it was lost to history, being rediscovered in 1888 during a reconstruction project.

=== Museum ===
The Bojnice Museum is a national art and history museum with a documentation, research, and methodical workplace that acquires, protects, processes, and makes available documents about the region. The collection includes: fine arts (paintings, sculptures), housewares (furniture, clocks, chandeliers and candlesticks, ceramics, earthenware, faience, porcelain), tools (weapons, craftsman supplies), and apparel (armor, textiles).

=== Park ===
A natural and landscaped surrounds Bojnické Castle. While local peoples cultivated plants around the castle, the first formally documented park dates to 1910. The park features several prominent trees and landscaped areas.

== Legends ==
There are many legends relating to the Bojnice Castle, known mostly to the locals. These include the Legend of a Broken Heart, The Story of Peter Poky, and the most famous of them all, The Legend of the Black Lady.

== Castle park ==
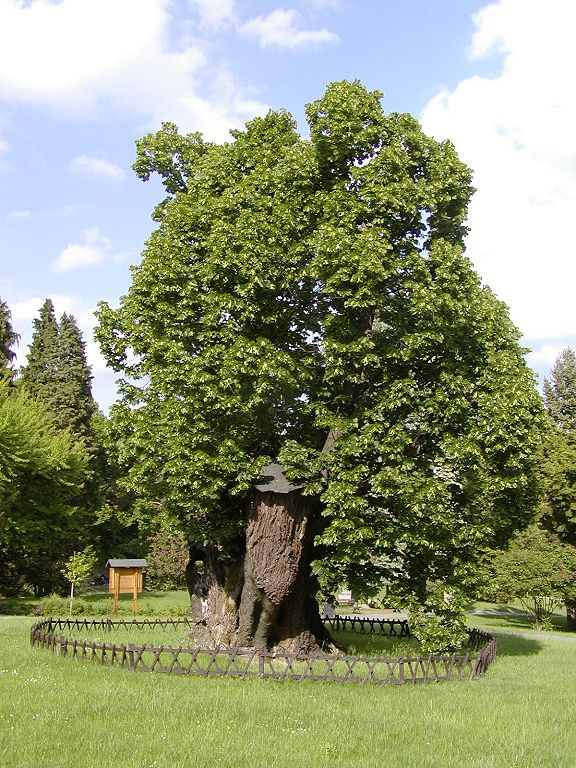
The Linden Tree of King Matthias, approximately 700 years old, one of the oldest documented trees in Slovakia

Bojnice Castle is surrounded by the castle park featuring numerous species of trees. The park also contains the Bojnice Zoo, the oldest and one of the most visited zoos in Slovakia. The castle park continues in the form of a forest park in the Strážov Mountains.

== Gallery ==
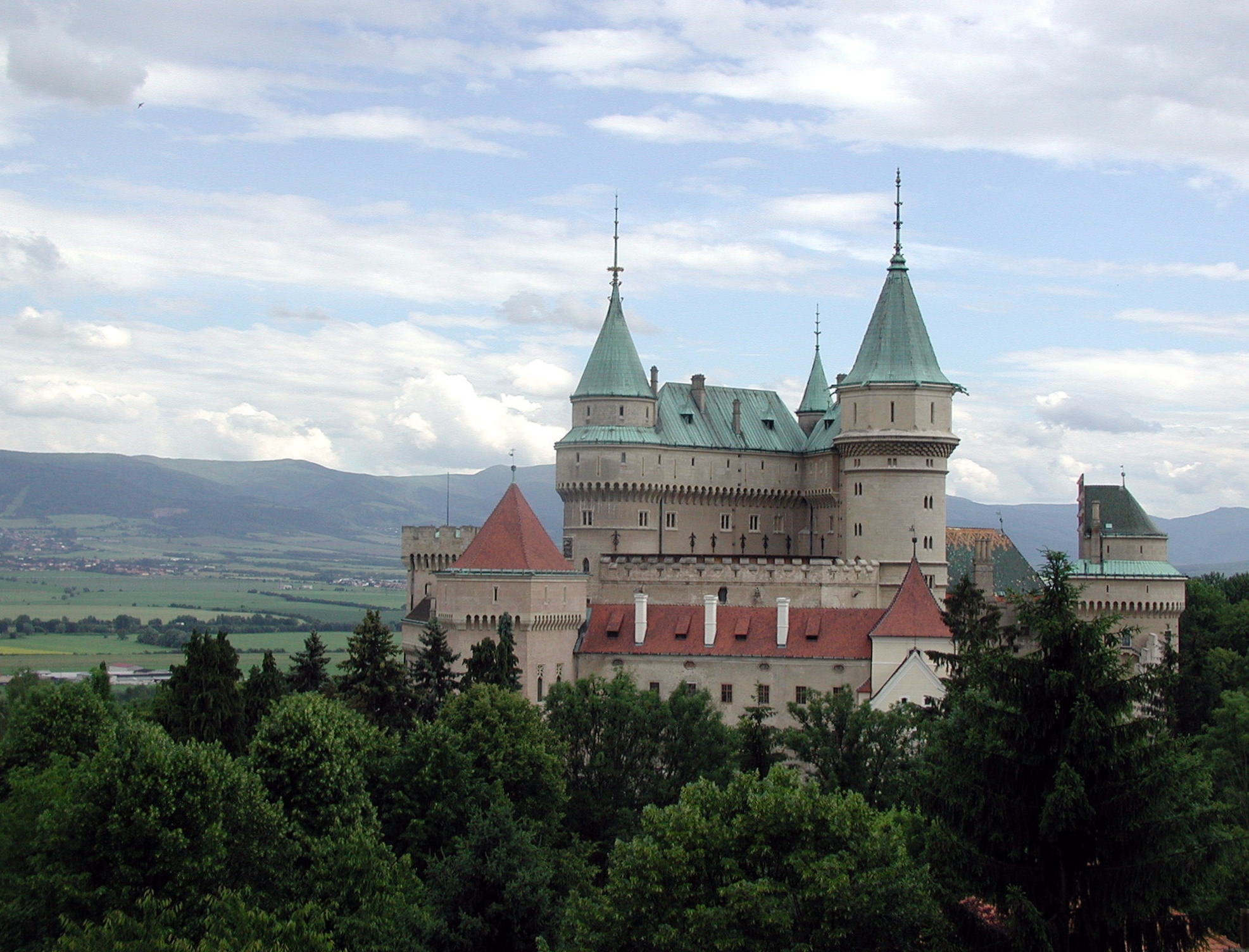
Bojnice Castle, 2004

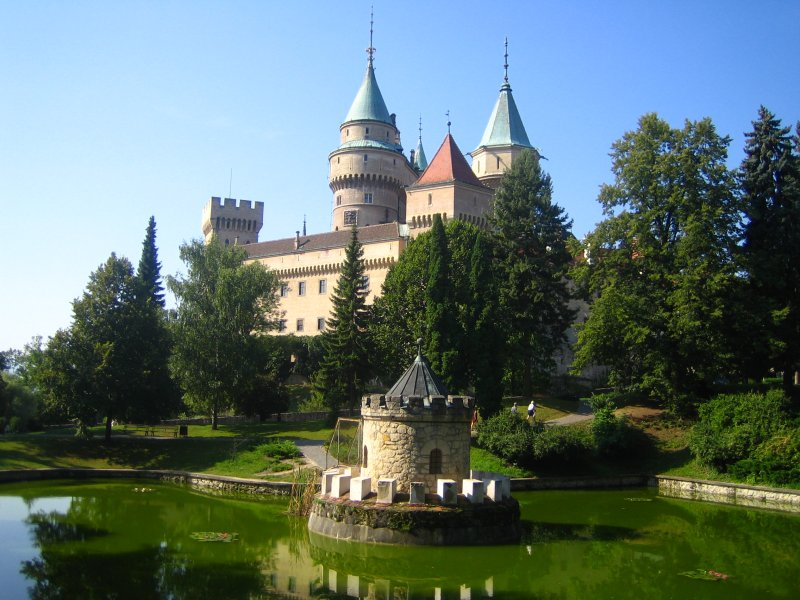
Bojnice Castle, 2007

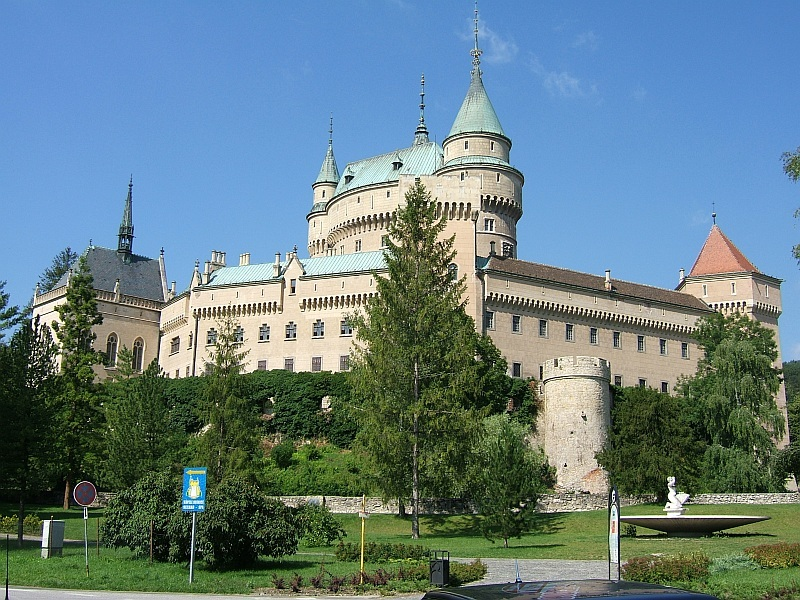
Bojnice Castle

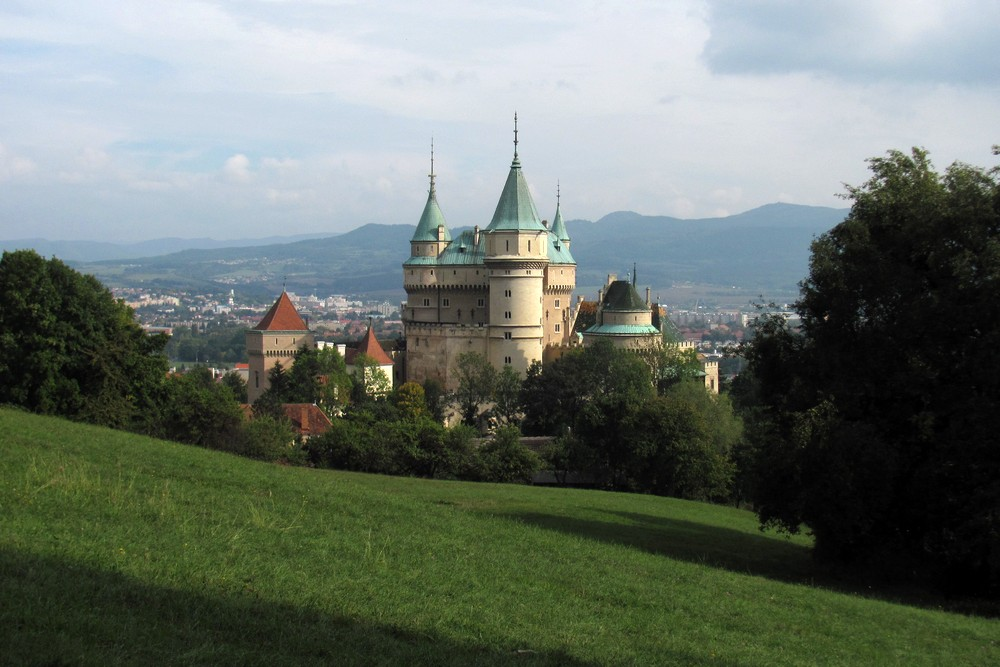
View of Bojnice Castle from west.

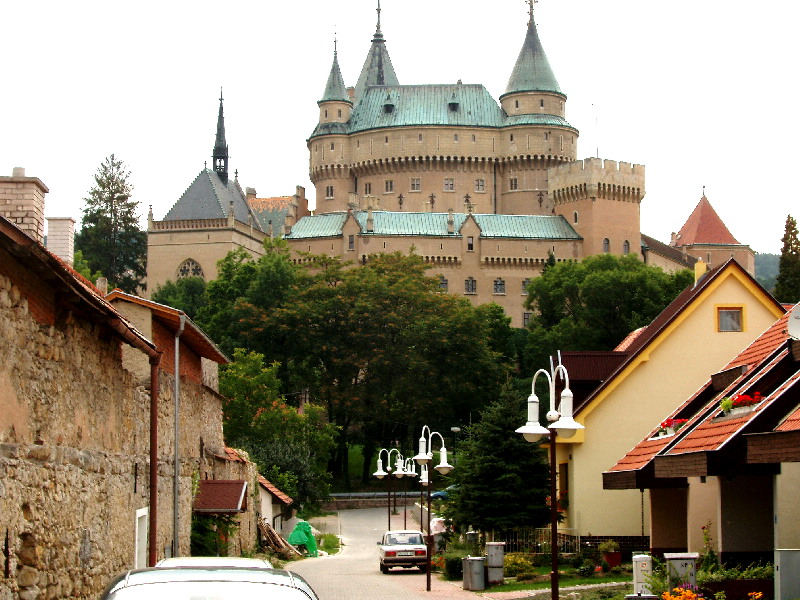
Bojnice Castle as seen from the town

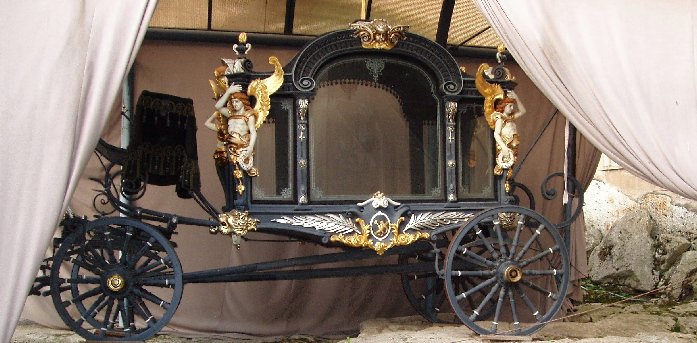
Pálffy funeral carriage inside the castle

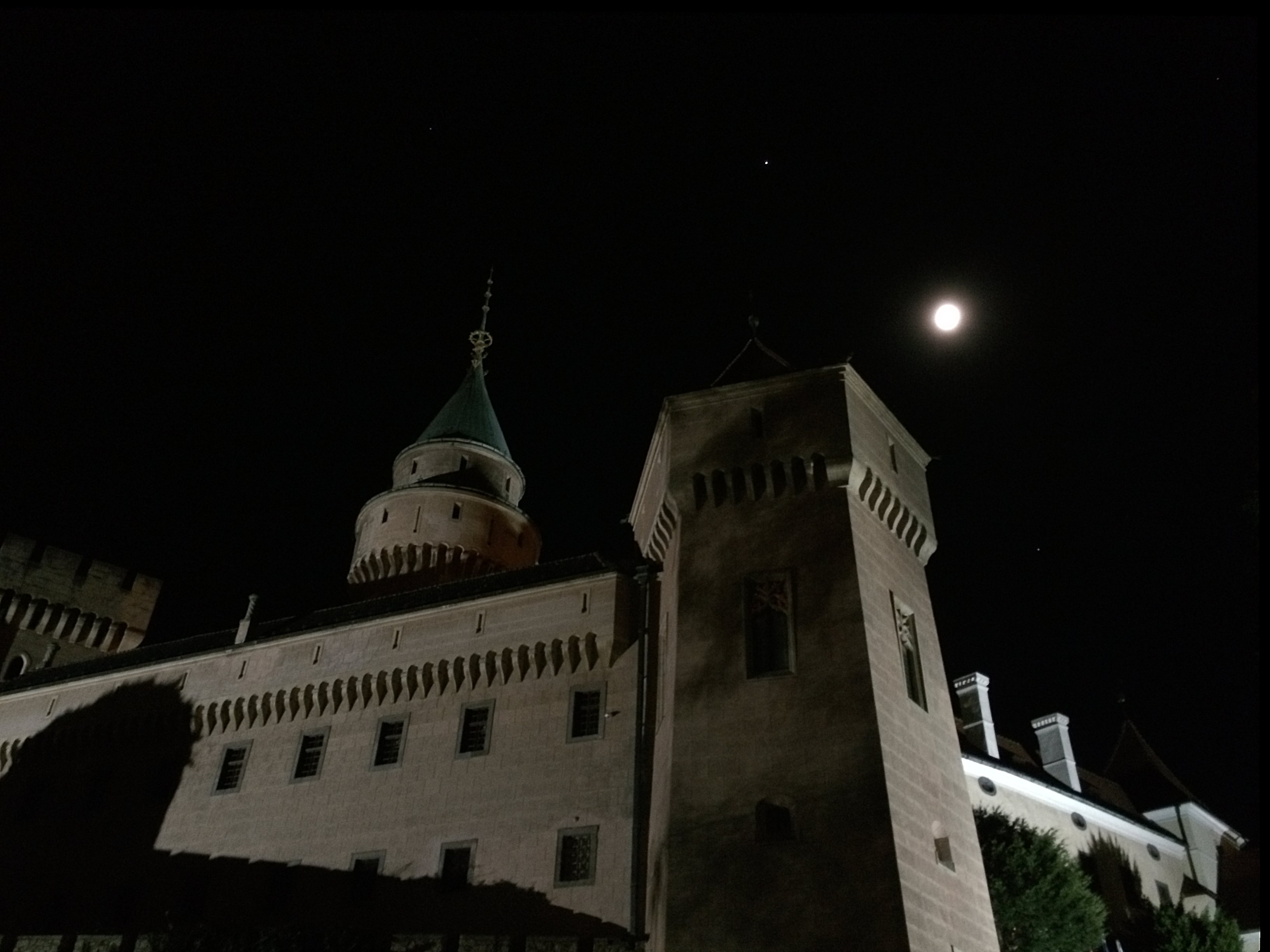
Bojnice Castle at night, 2015

== See also ==
- List of castles in Slovakia
- Tourism in Slovakia
