= World Association of Zoos and Aquariums =

Umbrella organization

- Abbreviation: WAZA
- Predecessor: Union of Directors of Zoological Gardens (IUDZG)
- Formation: 1935; 91 years ago
- Founded at: Basel, Switzerland
- Purpose: To guide, encourage and support the zoos, aquariums and like‑minded organisations of the world in animal care and welfare, environmental education and global conservation.
- Headquarters: Barcelona, Spain
- Region served: Worldwide
- Board of directors: WAZA Staff
- Website: www.waza.org
- Formerly called: World Zoo Organization

The World Association of Zoos and Aquariums (WAZA) is an umbrella organisation which provides membership to regional accrediting bodies for zoo and aquarium acround the world.

WAZA seeks to provides leadership for zoos, aquariums, and other partnering conservation organisations, with a focus on supporting animal care and welfare, conservation of biodiversity, environmental education and global sustainability.

== History ==
In 1935, a collective of zoo directors and curators gathered together in Basel, Switzerland, to discuss forming a global association. This meeting resulted in the establishment the first iteration of the International Union of Directors of Zoological Gardens (IUDZG). Due to the geopolitical impact of World War II, the organisation was subsequently disbanded somewhere between 1938-1939.

In 1946, a cohort of zoo directors from both allied and neutral powers met in Rotterdam, Netherlands, to reform under the same International Union of Directors of Zoological Gardens (IUDZG) title. In this second iteration of the organisation, directors from axis powers were excluded from membership.

In 1950, the IUDZG became a member of the International Union for the Protection of Nature (IUPN), now known as the International Union for Conservation of Nature (IUCN).

In June 1951, Tadamichi Koda from Tokyo Zoological Park Society became the first member from a former-axis power to be admitted into the IUDZG. In 1958, Germany became the first former-axis power to host the IUDZG annual meeting.

In 1991, the IUDZG was rebranded as the World Zoo Organization (WZO), revising membership rules to include regional zoo associations.

In 2000, the organisation was again restructured into the current World Association of Zoos and Aquariums (WAZA), as to better reflect the organisation's international approach.

== Membership ==
WAZA offers four categories of membership: Associations, Institutions, Affiliates, or Corporations. Application requirements vary dependent on the geographic region and nature of organisation seeking affiliation.

As of 2026, there are over 400 WAZA-affiliated institutions and organisations.

=== Members ===
In addition, about 1300 zoos are linked to WAZA through membership in one of the about 25 regional or national association members.

Associate members (as of November 2022)
Type	Region	Association	Abbreviation
Regional	Africa	Pan African Association of Zoos and Aquaria	PAAZA
Regional	Asia	South East Asian Zoos Association	SEAZA
Regional	Oceania	Zoo and Aquarium Association Australasia	ZAA
Regional	Europe	European Association of Zoos and Aquaria	EAZA
Regional	Europe & Asia	Eurasian Regional Association of Zoos & Aquariums	EARAZA
Regional	Mesoamerica & Caribbean	Mesoamerican & Caribbean Zoos & Aquaria Association	AMACZOOA
Regional	Latin America	Latin American Zoo & Aquarium Association (Asociación Latinoamericana de Parques Zoológicos y Acuarios)	ALPZA
Regional	North America	Association of Zoos and Aquariums	AZA
National	Japan	Japanese Association of Zoos and Aquariums (日本動物園水族館協会)	JAZA
National	India	Central Zoo Authority	CZA
National	Czech Republic & Slovakia	Union of Czech and Slovak Zoological Gardens (Unie českých a slovenských zoologických zahrad)	USCZOO
National	Denmark	Danish Association of Zoological Gardens and Aquaria	DAZA
National	France	Association Française des Parcs Zoologiques	AFDPZ
National	Germany	Verband der Zoologischen Gärten	VDZ
National	Germany	Deutsche Tierpark-Gesellschaft e.V	DTG
National	Germany	Deutscher-Wildgehege-Verband e.V.	DWV
National	Italy	Italian Association of Zoos and Aquaria (L'Unione Italiana degli Zoo e Acquari)	UIZA
National	Netherlands	Dutch Zoo Federation (Nederlandse Vereniging van Dierentuinen)	NVD
National	Spain & Portugal	Iberian Association of Zoos & Aquaria (Asociación Ibérica de Zoos y Acuarios)	AIZA
National	Sweden	Swedish Association of Zoos and Aquaria (Svenska Djurparksföreningen)	SAZA, SDF
National	Switzerland	Swiss Association of Scientific Zoos (ZooSchweiz)	SASZ
National	United Kingdom	British and Irish Association of Zoos and Aquariums	BIAZA
National	Brazil	Association of Zoos and Aquariums of Brazil (Associação de Zoológicos e Aquários do Brasil)	AZAB
National	Colombia	Columbian Association of Zoos and Aquariums	ACOPAZOA
National	Venezuela	National Foundation of Zoological Parks and Aquaria in Venezuela (Fundación Nacional de Parques Zoológicos y Acuarios de Venezuela)	FUNPZA
National	Canada	Canada's Accredited Zoos and Aquariums / Aquariums et Zoos Accrédités du Canada	CAZA

Outside of the WAZA associations with direct memberships, there are also regional organizations who are members of the WAZA through an affiliated regional organization.

Associate members with indirect membership
Type	Region	Association	Abbreviation	Remark
National	Portugal	Associação Portuguesa de Zoos e Aquários	APZA	Member of WAZA through membership of EAZA
National	Poland	Association of Directors of Polish Zoological Gardens and Aquariums	RDPOZA/IPOZiA	Member of WAZA through membership of EAZA
National	Romania	Romanian Zoo and Aquaria Federation	SZAF / FBZAR	Member of WAZA through membership of EAZA

== Conservation ==
=== WAZA-Branding of In Situ Projects ===
Members of the World Association of Zoos and Aquariums and the wider WAZA Network undertake or support thousands of in situ, or combined ex situ-in situ projects. It is estimated that zoos, aquariums and zoo and aquarium associations jointly expend in excess of 50 million euros per year for such projects. Reintroduction and restocking projects have been undertaken with about 200 species. In addition, in situ activities include now often also educational programmes aimed at the local people and at the politicians, biological programmes (research and monitoring), socio-economic projects, social work among the local people, public relations activities and much more on a national and international scale – all in order to secure the conservation efforts far into the future.

Since these efforts are largely invisible to the general public, in 2003 WAZA started allowing organisations to request and use the WAZA brand on projects executed or supported by the WAZA constituency. Currently more than 150 projects around the world are WAZA branded.

=== The World Zoo and Aquarium Conservation Strategy ===
In 1993, The World Zoo Organisation (IUDZG) and the Captive Breeding Specialist Group of The World Conservation Union (IUCN) published The World Zoo Conservation Strategy. That strategy defined, for the first time in a single document, the responsibilities and opportunities that the international zoo and aquarium community needed, in order to be fully involved in nature conservation. The pressures and threats to wildlife remain and have indeed increased. The need for help in conservation has intensified. It is therefore an opportune time for all zoos and aquariums to re-examine the ways and means by which they can consolidate and increase their support and involvement in conservation. In 2005 a revised, second strategy, "Building a Future for Wildlife: the World Zoo and Aquarium Conservation Strategy", was published by the World Zoo and Aquarium Association (WAZA). This document reinforces and expands the overall themes of the first document and presents a vision of the roles that all zoos and aquariums can and must play in the conservation of wildlife and of their ecosystems. The 72-page document, which is the result of assistance and advice from over 350 people, is truly international in its scope and in its production. The Strategy is aimed at all zoos and aquariums, however large or small, however rich or poor, and not just those that are members of WAZA.

The Strategy provides a common philosophy for zoos and aquariums across the globe and defines the standards and policies that are necessary to achieve their goals in conservation. The 2005 Strategy will be of use and interest not to only zoo and aquarium people but to anyone concerned with biodiversity conservation and sustainable development. The document begins with a supportive foreword from the Director General of The World Conservation Union (IUCN), and a preface by the President of WAZA and by the Chair of the WAZA Conservation Committee, that set out the genesis and production of the Strategy. The document comprises nine chapters, with each chapter having a summary, a vision statement, a main text, conclusions, and a series of recommendations. This Strategy will be used by individual zoos and aquariums, by national and regional associations, and by WAZA itself, as the basis for the development of action plans for the implementation of the recommendations.

The document is available today in English, German and Russian. Bahasa, French, Japanese and Polish versions, as well as Urdu, Hindi, Bengali or Bangla, Dari and Singala summaries are currently under preparation.

In 2009, the World Zoo and Aquarium Conservation Strategy (WZACS) was especially implemented for the international aquarium community in the document entitled Turning the Tide: A Global Aquarium Strategy for Conservation and Sustainability.

=== International Studbooks ===
International studbooks for endangered and rare species are kept under the auspices of the World Association of Zoos and Aquariums (WAZA). In most cases, staff of WAZA member institutions serve as studbook keepers. The International Studbook Office is hosted by the Zoological Society of London, and a staff member of the WAZA executive office acts as International Studbook Coordinator. Within WAZA, the Committee on Population Management (CPM) is the body dealing primarily with studbook issues. As of March 2008, there were 183 international studbooks including all subspecies and species that are kept as separate studbooks. Altogether, there are studbooks (international and regional) and/or breeding programmes for more than 850 different taxa.

=== Conservation Breeding Programs ===
Conservation breeding programmes (such as the Species Survival Plan (SSP), established 1981, or the European Endangered Species Programme (EEP), established 1985) are typically organised at the level of the regional associations, in particular AZA and EAZA, because the exchange of animals between regions is expensive and difficult, primarily due to veterinary restrictions. In 2003, WAZA adopted the Global Species Management Plans (GSMPs), a procedure for establishing interregional programmes. As at 2018, there are nine GSMPs under the auspices of WAZA, covering the Sumatran tiger, red panda, blue-crowned laughingthrush, Amur tiger, Goodfellow's tree-kangaroo, Amur leopard, anoa, babirusa, and banteng.

Currently only a small number of rare, endangered or extinct-in-the-wild species have been reintroduced or reestablished via conservation breeding programmes. Przewalski's horse was re-classified as endangered from extinct in the wild in 2011, but is in the minority of animals that have recovered from being exinct in the wild. The majority of Species reintroduction efforts focus on returning animals with existing wild populations to historic habitats.

=== Relationship with IUCN ===
- WAZA provides financial support to IUCN Species Survival Commission and to its Specialist Groups, such as the South American Camelid Specialist Group.
- WAZA promotes the use of the newly developed IUCN Red List of Threatened Species branding and many zoos and aquariums have already in 2010 made use of it.
- WAZA has published on December 1, 2009, a book on 'The Future of Wildlife' to mark the 2010 International Year of Biodiversity, with contributions from partners including IUCN.
- WAZA supports international endeavours for amphibian conservation and is partnering with IUCN and its Conservation Breeding Specialist Group in the 'Amphibian Ark'.

=== Projects ===
WAZA works in partnership with international organisations with a view to contribute to the conservation of biodiversity. Two examples of WAZA supported projects on the occasion of the International Year of the Gorilla 2009 are:

The Nouabalé - Ndoki Project in Democratic Republic of the Congo is supported by the WCS (USA), Toronto Zoo (Canada), La Palmyre Zoo (France), La Vallée des Singes (France), USAID (CARPE program), USFWS, and FFEM. Since the early 90s, WCS aims to help conserve biodiversity in Congo by working with the government, local communities and private sector partners to adopt a landscape scale management approach, establishing and maintaining a network of well-managed protected areas, including the Nouabalé - Ndoki National Park.

Conservation of the Cross River gorilla in Nigeria, implemented by Kolmarden Foundation, the Great Ape Trust of Iowa (Iowa Zoo), Columbus Zoo, Zoo Boise, supported by Wildlife Conservation Society (Bronx Zoo), Great Ape Conservation Fund (US Fish and Wildlife Service), African Great Apes Programme (WWF), Margot Marsh Biodiversity Foundation, Berggorilla and Regenwald Direkthilfe, North Carolina Zoo. The Cross River gorilla project in Nigeria has four main components:

- Support for protected area development
- Landscape level conservation action
- Research
- Conservation education

== Education ==
WAZA provides interactive, structured educational workshops, classes, and resources tailored to meet the specific needs of groups, zoos and aquariums and contribute to learning and understanding as part of local and national curricula frameworks. Many zoos now have an education department, a classroom, and full-time educational officers.

WAZA encourages all of its staff to participate in local, national, regional and international networks such as the International Zoo Educators Association (IZEA) and its regional groups.

== Secretariat ==
A permanent Executive Office has been established in October 2001. The Office was located in the centre of Bern, Switzerland at this time. From May 2010 to September 2018, the WAZA Executive Office was situated in the heart of IUCN's newly built Conservation Centre in Gland, Switzerland. The permanent executive office of WAZA is currently located in the city of Barcelona, Spain.

Under a MOU it provides also secretariat support to the International Zoo Educators Association (IZEA).

== See also ==
- List of zoo associations
