= Bojnice =

- Municipality
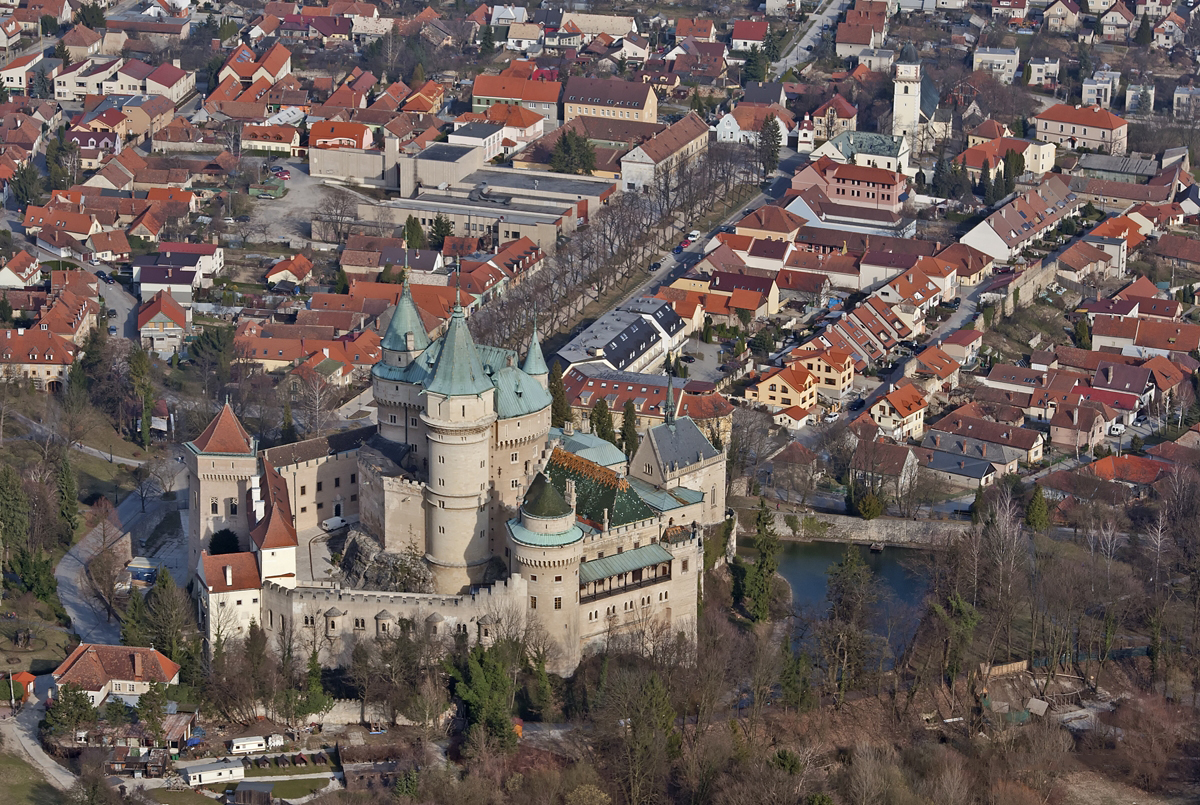
- Town of Bojnice and Bojnice Castle

- Flag Coat of arms

- Location of Bojnice in the Trenčín Region Location of Bojnice in Slovakia
- Coordinates: 48.78°N 18.58°E
- Country: Slovakia
- Region: Trenčín Region
- District: Prievidza District
- First mentioned: 1113

Government
  - Mayor: Ladislav Smatana

Area
  - Total: 19.92 km^{2} (7.69 sq mi)
- Elevation: 291 m (955 ft)

Population (2025)
  - Total: 5,049
- Time zone: UTC+1 (CET)
  - Summer (DST): UTC+2 (CEST)
- Postal code: 972 01
- Area code: +421 46
- Vehicle registration plate (until 2022): PD
- Website: www.bojnice.sk

Bojnice (German: Weinitz; Hungarian: Bajmóc) is a historical town in western Slovakia located on the Nitra river, near the city of Prievidza. The town is situated just below the Bojnice Castle. It has a population of around 5,000.

Bojnice is best known for its popular tourist attractions, among them being the largest zoo in Slovakia and the Bojnice castle, and generally for being one of the oldest spa towns in Slovakia.

== Geography ==
The municipality lies at an altitude of 291 metres (955 ft) and covers an area of 19.92 km^{2} (7.69 sq mi) (2025).

Bojnice lies in the upper Nitra River valley, under the Strážov Mountains. It is located very near the city of Prievidza, with which it shares a common public transport system. Other major cities nearby include Žilina 60 kilometres to the north and Trenčín 65 kilometres to the west.

== History ==
The town's history is closely connected to that of Bojnice Castle. The town was first mentioned in writing in 1113, when it was mentioned as a settlement under the castle. Bojnice was granted town privileges in 1366.

== Landmarks ==
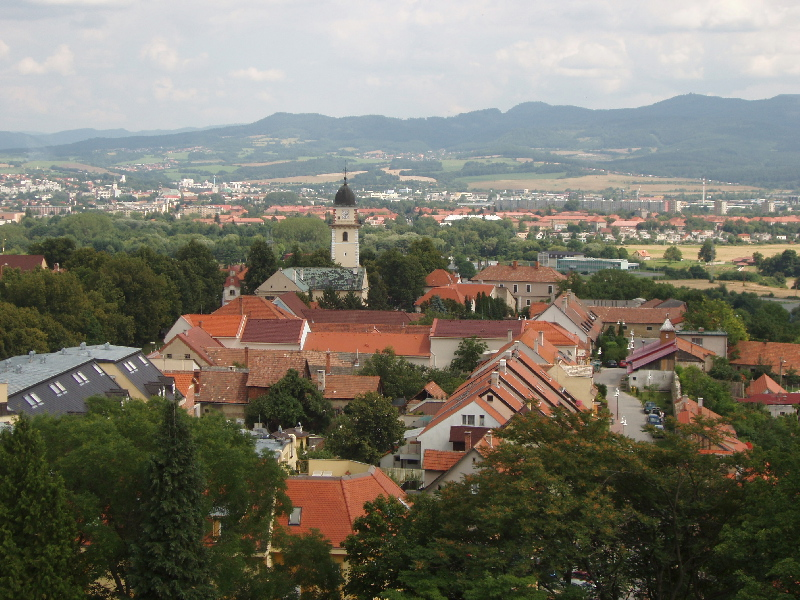
View of Bojnice from the Castle

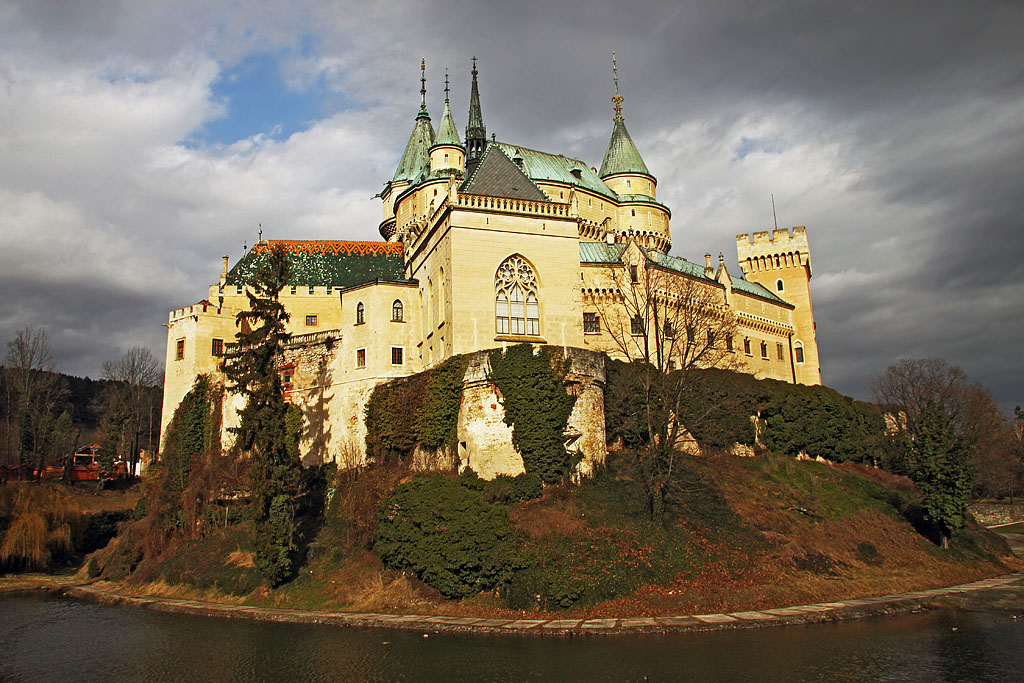
Bojnice Castle, as seen from the castle park

The town is most known for the Bojnice Castle, first mentioned in 1113 and originally built as a wooden fort, it was over time built as a stone castle and in the 20th century, in the Romantic style. Today, it is a popular tourist attraction. The castle has appeared in many international films, and a well-known international festival of spectres takes place there every year. It is built on travertine rock with a natural cave.

The Bojnice zoo was founded in 1955. In 2006, it had 355 different species and more than 1,800 animals.

Bojnice is also known for its spa. The therapeutic springs were mentioned 1549 for the first time. Today they treat patients with disorders of the locomotor system, with rheumatic diseases, post-traumatic conditions, orthopaedic disturbances of the spine, neurological diseases and occupational diseases.

== Population ==
Population statistic (10 years)
Year	1995	2005	2015	2025
Count	4980	4983	4941	5049
Difference		+0.06%	−0.84%	+2.18%

Population statistic
Year	2024	2025
Count	5073	5049
Difference		−0.47%

It has a population of 5049 people (31 December 2025).

=== Ethnicity ===
Census 2021 (1+ %)
Ethnicity	Number	Fraction
Slovak	4582	92.04%
Not found out	317	6.36%
Total	4978	

In year 2021 was 4978 people by ethnicity 4582 as Slovak, 317 as Not found out, 47 as Czech, 41 as Other, 28 as German, 24 as Hungarian, 19 as Ukrainian, 14 as Russian, 9 as Italian, 6 as Chinese, 5 as Polish, 4 as Turkish, 3 as Jewish, 3 as Irish, 3 as Moravian, 2 as Romani, 2 as Rusyn, 2 as French, 2 as Croatian, 1 as Romanian, 1 as Austrian, 1 as Canadian and 1 as Bulgarian.

Note on population: The difference values of population numbers in the table "Population statistic" and in the sections "Ethnicity" & "Religion" is caused by the use of various statistical methods.

=== Religion ===
Census 2021 (1+ %)
Religion	Number	Fraction
Roman Catholic Church	2643	53.09%
None	1788	35.92%
Not found out	321	6.45%
Evangelical Church	64	1.29%
Total	4978	

In year 2021 was 4978 people by religion 2643 from Roman Catholic Church, 1788 from None, 321 from Not found out, 64 from Evangelical Church, 24 from Other, 22 from Christian Congregations in Slovakia, 20 from Ad hoc movements, 15 from Jehovah's Witnesses, 15 from Greek Catholic Church, 13 from Eastern Orthodox Church, 12 from Other and not ascertained christian church, 12 from Islam, 10 from Buddhism, 8 from Paganism and natural spirituality, 3 from Jewish community, 3 from Calvinist Church, 2 from Baptists Church, 2 from Apostolic Church and 1 from Hinduism.

According to the 2001 census, the town had 5,006 inhabitants. 97.06% of inhabitants were Slovaks, 0.68% Czechs and 0.24% Germans (Carpathian Germans). The religious make-up was 74.55% Roman Catholics, 19% people with no religious affiliation and 2% Lutherans.

== Notable people ==
- Karina Habšudová, tennis player
- Miloslav Mečíř, tennis player, Olympic winner
- Andrej Sekera, Dallas Stars (National Hockey League) defenseman
- Mirka Vavrinec, tennis player
- Zuzana Paulechová, classical pianist
- Antonia Liskova, Italian actress
- Erika Pochybova Johnson, artist
- Juraj Kucka, footballer
- Anna Záborská, Member of the European Parliament
- Ján Vlasko, slovak footballer

== Twin towns — sister cities ==
Bojnice is twinned with:

- Jeseník, Czech Republic
- Bad Krozingen, Germany
- Rosta, Italy
- Zator, Poland

== See also ==
- List of municipalities and towns in Slovakia

== Genealogical resources ==
The records for genealogical research are available at the state archive "Statny Archiv in Nitra, Slovakia"

- Roman Catholic church records (births/marriages/deaths): 1668-1912 (parish A)
