= Safari park =

Zoo-like tourist attraction

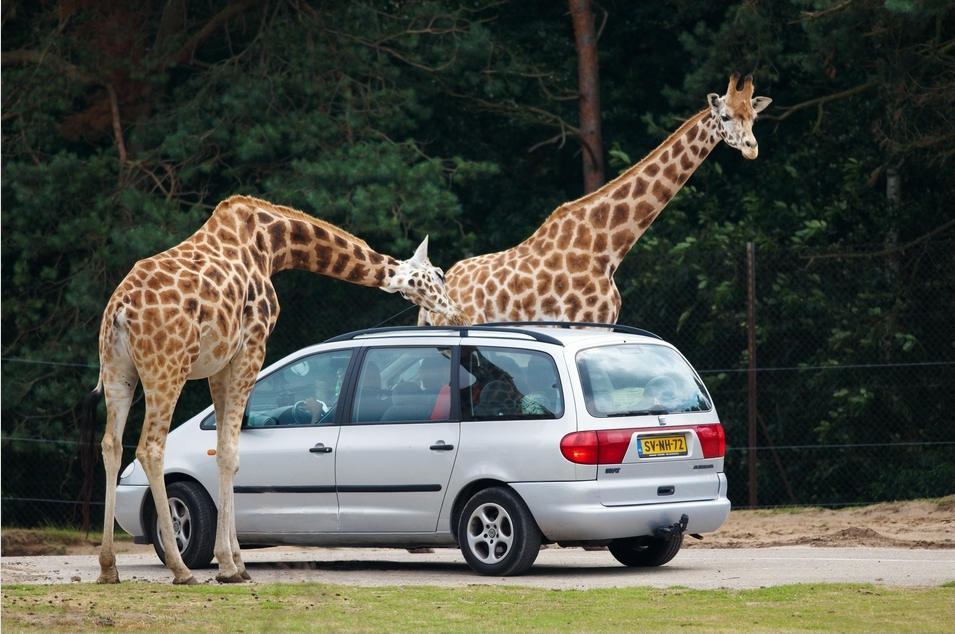
Giraffes at the Safaripark Beekse Bergen, Netherlands

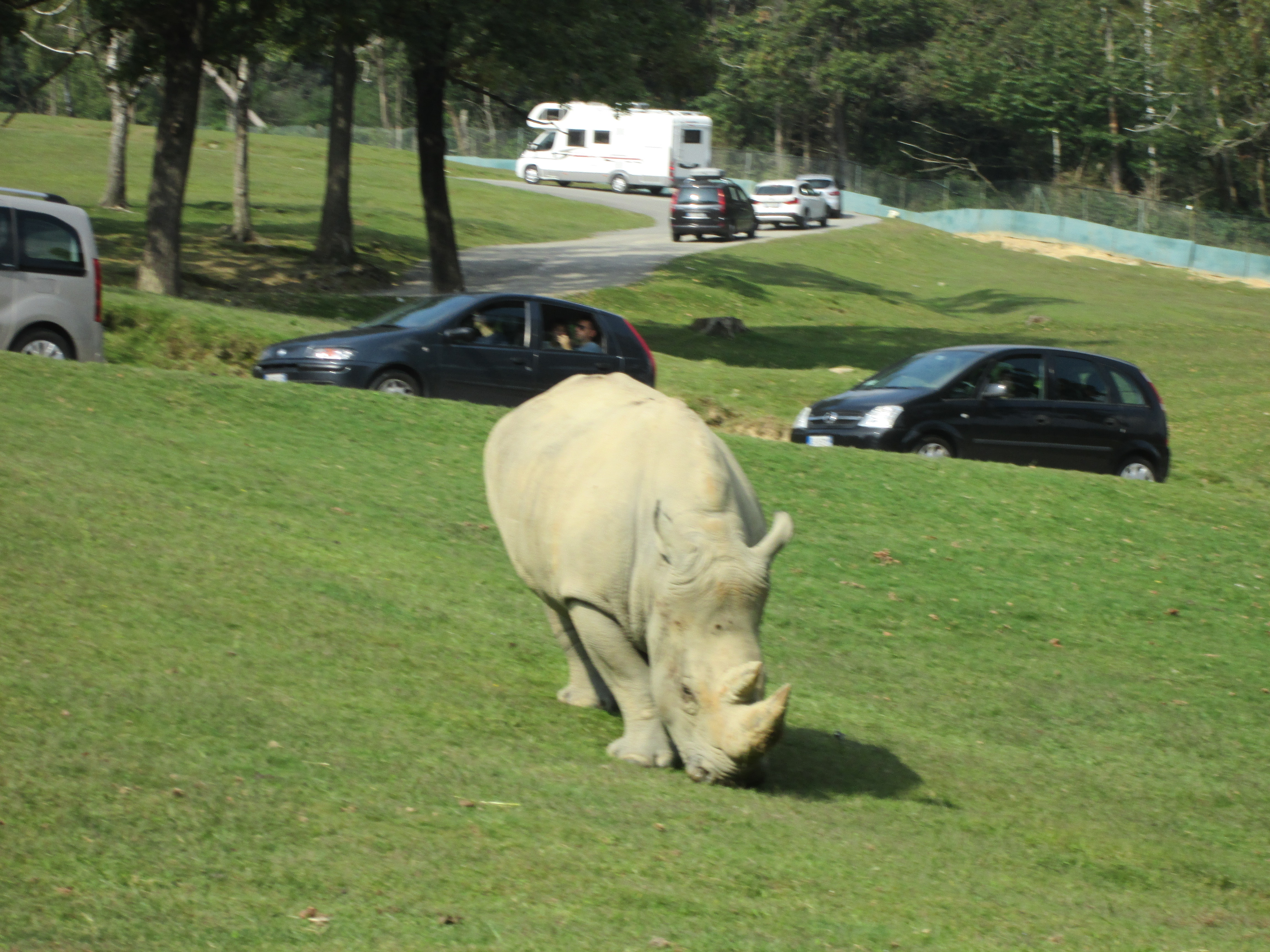
White rhinoceros at Pombia Safari Park, Italy

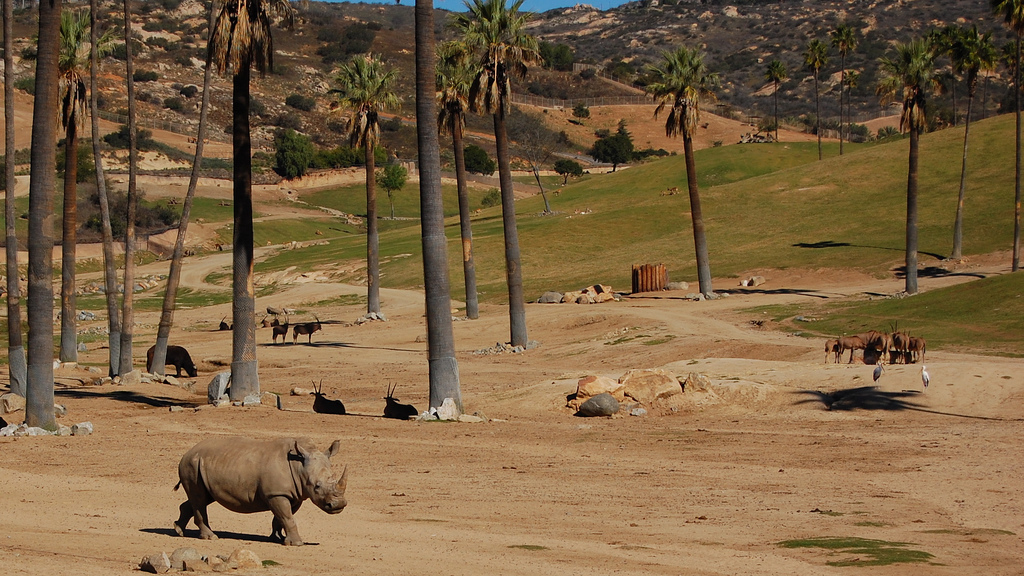
White Rhinoceros at San Diego Safari Park, US

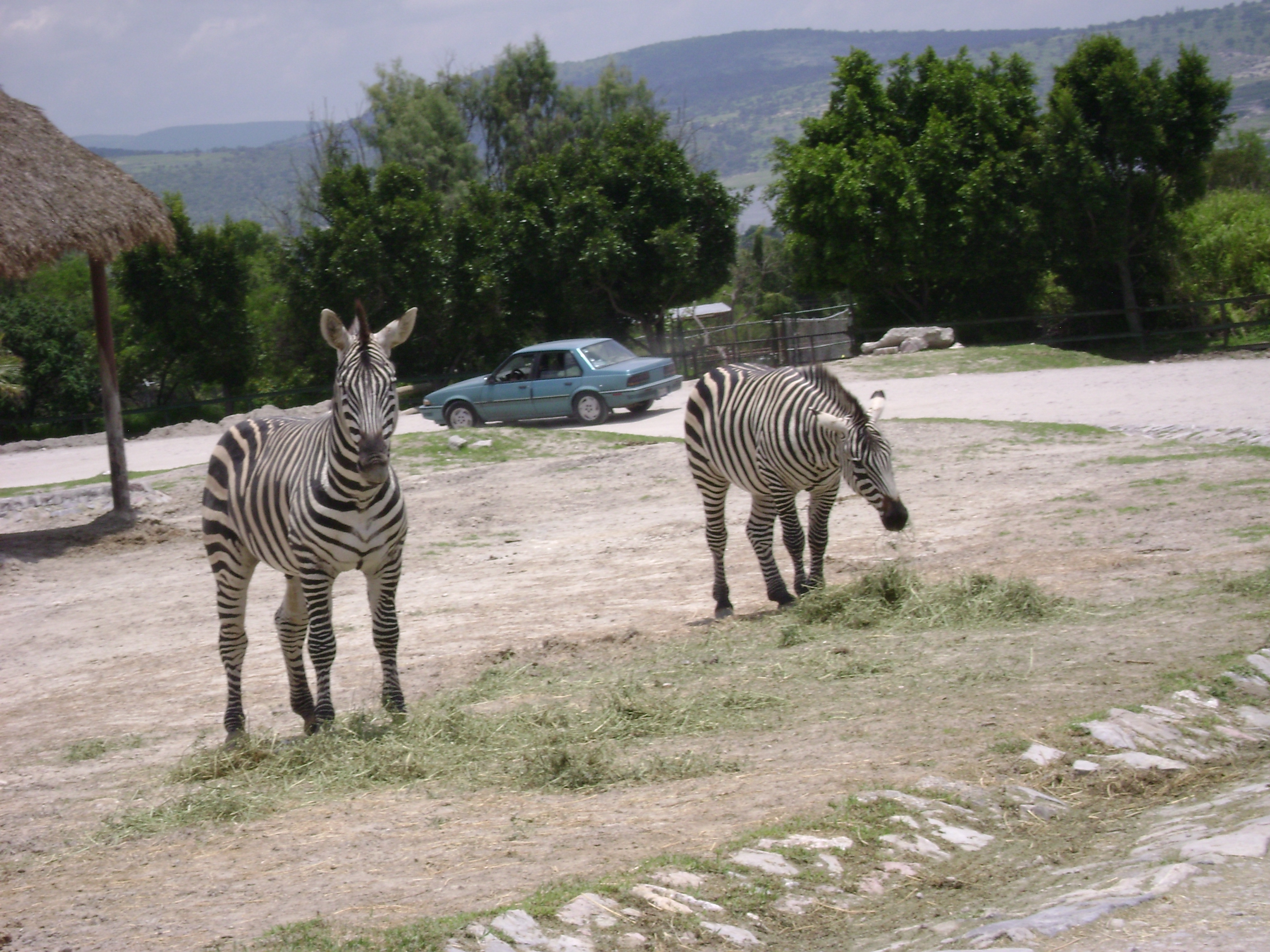
Grant's zebras at Africam Safari, Mexico

A safari park, sometimes known as a wildlife park, is a zoo where visitors can drive their own vehicles or ride in vehicles provided by the facility to observe freely roaming animals.

Many parks have conservation programmes with endangered animals like: elephants, white rhinos, giraffes, lions, tigers, cheetahs and wild dogs.

== General overview of a safari park ==
The main attractions are frequently large animals from Africa which people can see in wildlife reserves such as: giraffes, lions (including white lions), white rhinos, African bush elephants, hippopotamuses, zebras, ostriches, lesser and greater flamingos, ground hornbills, guineafowl, African buffaloes, sometimes dromedary camels, great white and pink-backed pelicans, African sacred ibises, Ankole cattle, cheetahs, leopards, hyenas, chimpanzees, baboons, African wild dogs, Barbary sheep, crowned cranes, Egyptian geese, saddle-billed, yellow-billed and marabou storks, Nile crocodiles (in a side paddock), Nubian ibexes, and many antelope species including- wildebeest, hartebeest, topi, gazelles, elands, lechwe, addaxes, oryxes, bongos, kudus, nyalas, impalas, springbok, blesbok, sitatunga, duikers, waterbucks, sable antelopes, and roan antelopes, just to name a few.

Also in the reserves there are animals that are not from Africa: Asian species include: Asian elephants, Indian and Sumatran rhinoceroses, gaur, water buffaloes, nilgais, blackbucks, banteng, markhor, Malayan tapirs, wild asses, sambar deer, Indian hog deer, yaks, gibbons, tigers (including white tigers), Asian black bears, Eld's deer, babirusas, chital, dholes, barasinghas, painted storks, peafowl, and Bactrian camels; North American species include: American black bears, brown bears, wolves (including Arctic wolves), American bison, elk, and white-tailed deer; South American species include: llamas, alpacas, jaguars, capybaras, anteaters, South American tapirs, rheas, and black-necked swans; Australian species include kangaroos, wallabies, emus, and black swans; European species include: European bisons, Eurasian wolves, mute swans, fallow deer, red deer, and moose.

Most safari parks have a "walk-around" area with animals too small or too dangerous to roam freely in the reserves, like: small birds, squirrel monkeys, penguins, marmosets, tamarins, mongooses, meerkats, lemurs, gorillas, reptiles, hornbills, red pandas, snow leopards, otters and warthogs. Some also have: children's zoos, aquariums, butterfly houses and reptile and insect houses. Besides animals, in the walk-round area, there are public facilities like toilets, snack bars and cafés, play areas and sometimes amusement rides. There can be walk-through exhibits with animals like kangaroos, lemurs and wallabies. The Knowsley Safari in England keeps Siberian tigers and giraffes in their walking area.

Safari parks often have other associated tourist attractions: golf courses, carnival rides, cafés/restaurants, ridable miniature railways, boat trips to see aquatic animals like sea lions, life-sized recreations of dinosaurs and other prehistoric animals, plant mazes, playgrounds, monorails, cable cars and gift shops. These are commonly found in the walk-around area. On river safari areas, there may be islands with primates; Longleat keeps gorillas and black-and-white colobus on their islands, which are used to house chimpanzees and siamangs; African Lion Safari in Canada has black-and-white ruffed lemurs, ring-tailed lemurs, lar gibbons, siamangs, Colombian spider monkeys, Geoffroy's spider monkeys, pink-backed pelicans and black swans in the waters.

== History and list of parks ==
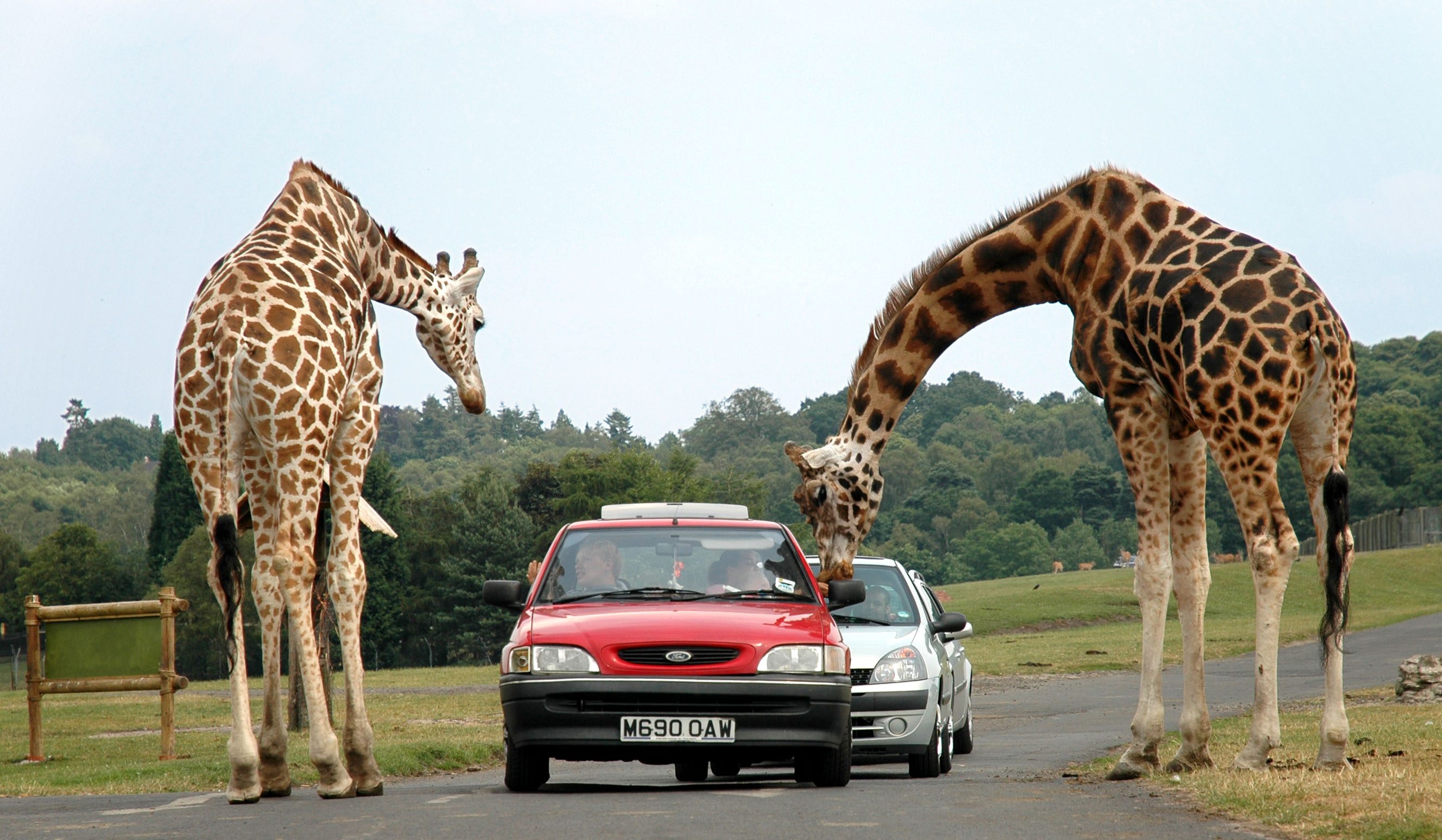
Giraffes being fed by visitors in the West Midlands Safari Park, England

The predecessor of safari parks is Africa U.S.A. Park (1953–1961) in Florida.

The first lion drive-through opened in 1963 in Tama Zoological Park in Tokyo. In double-glazed buses, visitors made a tour through a one-hectare enclosure with twelve African lions.

The first drive-through safari park outside of Africa opened in 1966 at Longleat in Wiltshire, England. Longleat, Windsor, Woburn and arguably the whole concept of safari parks were the brainchild of Jimmy Chipperfield (1912–1990), former co-director of Chipperfield's Circus, although a similar concept is explored as a plot device in Angus Wilson's "The Old Men at the Zoo" which was published five years before Chipperfield set up Longleat. Longleat's Marquess of Bath agreed to Chipperfield's proposition to fence off 40 hectares (100 acres) of his vast Wiltshire estate to house 50 lions. Knowsley, the Earl of Derby's estate outside Liverpool, and the Duke of Bedford's Woburn estate in Bedfordshire both established their own safari parks with Chipperfield's partnership. Another circus family, the Smart Brothers, joined the safari park business by opening a park at Windsor for visitors from London. The former Windsor Safari Park was in Berkshire, England, but closed in 1992 and has since been made into a Legoland theme park. There is also Chipperfield's "Scotland Safari Park" established on Baronet Sir John Muir's estate at Blair Drummond near Stirling, and the American-run "West Midland Safari and Leisure Park" near Birmingham. One park, along with Jimmy Chipperfield at Lambton Castle in North East England, has closed.

Between 1967 and 1974, Lion Country Safari, Inc. opened 6 animal parks, one near each of the following American cities: West Palm Beach, Florida; Los Angeles, California; Grand Prairie, Texas; Atlanta, Georgia; Cincinnati, Ohio, and Richmond, Virginia. The first park, in South Florida, is the only Lion Country Safari still in operation.

Royal Burgers' Zoo at Arnhem, opened a "safari park" in 1968 within a traditional zoo. In 1995, Burgers' Safari modified this to a walking safari with a 250-metre (820 ft) boardwalk. Another safari park in the Netherlands is Safaripark Beekse Bergen.

Most safari parks were established in a short period of ten years, between 1966 and 1975.

- Africa
  - Egypt: Alexandria (Africa Safari Park, 2004)
- Americas
  - Brazil: São Paulo (Zoo Safári, 2001 - this park was formerly known as Simba Safari from 1972 to 2001)
  - Canada:
    - Ontario: Hamilton (African Lion Safari, 1969)
    - Quebec: Hemmingford (Parc Safari, 1972), Montebello (Parc Omega, 1985)
  - Chile: Rancagua (Safari Park Rancagua, 2009)
  - Guatemala: Escuintla (Auto Safari Chapin, 1980)
  - Mexico:
    - Amacuzac (Zoofari, 1984), Puebla (Africam Safari, 1972)
  - United States:
    - Alabama: Hope Hull, Alabama (Alabama Safari Park, 2018)
    - Arizona: Camp Verde (Out of Africa Wildlife Park, 1988)
    - Arkansas: Gentry (Wild Wilderness Drive-Through Safari, 1970)
    - California: Escondido (San Diego Zoo Safari Park, formerly San Diego Wild Animal Park, 1972)
    - Florida: Loxahatchee (Lion Country Safari, 1967)
    - Georgia: Pine Mountain (Wild Animal Safari, 1991), Cleveland, Georgia (North Georgia Wildlife and Safari Park, 2018), Metter, Georgia (Wild Georgia Safari Park, 2018), Hartwell, Georgia (Lake Hartwell Wildlife Safari, 2021), Atlanta (Atlanta Safari Park, 2023), Madison, Georgia (Georgia Safari Conservation Park, 2024)
    - Louisiana: Delhi (High Delta Safari Park, 2009)
    - Nebraska: Ashland (Lee G. Simmons Conservation Park and Wildlife Safari, 1998)
    - New Jersey: Jackson Township (Great Adventure, 1974, now Six Flags Great Adventure)
    - New York: Chittenango (Wild Animal Park, 2010)
    - Ohio: Port Clinton (African Safari Wildlife Park, 1973)
    - Oregon: Winston (Wildlife Safari, 1973)
    - Texas: San Antonio (Natural Bridge Wildlife Ranch, 1984), Glen Rose (Fossil Rim Wildlife Ranch, 1984), near Dallas (Texas Zoosafari Park, 2023)
    - Virginia: Natural Bridge (Virginia Safari Park, 2000)
- Asia
  - Bangladesh: Gazipur (Gazipur Safari Park, 2013), Cox's Bazar (Dulahazara Safari Park, 1999)
  - China: Shenzhen (Safari Park, 1993), Shanghai (Wild Animal Park, 1995), Qinhuangdao (Qinhuangdao Wildlife Park, 1995), Guangzhou (Xiangjiang Safari Park, 1997), Jinan (Safari Park, 1999), Badaling (Safari World, 2001)
  - India: Etawah (Etawah Safari Park, formerly Lion Safari Etawah, 2019), Rajgir (Rajgir Zoo Safari, 2022)
  - Indonesia: Cisarua, Prigen and Bali (in Bali includes a Marine Park too) (Taman Safari, 1990)
  - Israel: Ramat Gan (Ramat Gan Safari, 1974)
  - Japan: Miyazaki (Phoenix Zoo, 1975), Usa (Kyushu Natural Animal Park African Safari, 1976), Mine (Akiyoshidai Safari Land, 1977), Tomioka (Gunma Safari Park, 1979), Susono (Fuji Safari Park, 1980), Himeji (Central Park, 1984)
  - Malaysia: Alor Gajah (A'Famosa Resort, 2001), Gambang (Bukit Gambang Safari Park)
  - Pakistan: Lahore (Lahore Zoo Safari, 2009, formerly Lahore Wildlife Park, 1982)
  - Philippines: Busuanga (Calauit Safari Park, 1975), Morong (Zoobic Safari, 2003), Carmen (Cebu Safari and Adventure Park, 2018)
  - Singapore: (Night Safari, 1994)
  - Taiwan: Guanxi (Leofoo Village Theme Park, 1979)
  - Thailand: Bangkok (Safari World, 1988)
  - United Arab Emirates: Dubai (Dubai Safari Park, 2017)
  - Vietnam: Phú Quốc (Vinpearl Safari, 2015)
- Europe
  - Belgium: Aywaille (Le Monde Sauvage, 1975)
  - Denmark: Givskud (Løveparken, 1969), Knuthenborg (Knuthenborg Safaripark, 1969), Ebeltoft (Ree Park – Ebeltoft Safari, 1991)
  - France: Thoiry (Wow Safari Thoiry, 1968), Peaugres (Safari de Peaugres, 1974), Sigean (Réserve africaine de Sigean, 1974), Obterre (Haute Touche Zoological Park, 1980) owned by the National Museum of Natural History, Port-Saint-Père (Planète Sauvage, 1992)
  - Germany: Gelsenkirchen (ZOOM Erlebniswelt Gelsenkirchen, 1949), Stuckenbrock (Safariland Stukenbrock, 1969), Hodenhagen (Serengeti Park, 1974)
  - Great Britain: Longleat (1966), Woburn (1970), Knowsley (1971), Bewdley (West Midlands Safari Park, 1973), Blair Drummond (1970), Highland Wildlife Park (1972)
  - Italy: Bussolengo (Parco Natura Viva, 1969), Fasano (Zoosafari Fasanolandia, 1973), Pombia (Pombia Safari Park, 1976), Murazzano (Parco Safari delle Langhe, 1976), Ravenna (Safari Ravenna, 2012)
  - Netherlands: Hilvarenbeek (Safaripark Beekse Bergen, 1968)
  - Portugal: Santo André (Badoca Safari Park, 1999)
  - Russia: near Kamenka (Kudykina Gora, 2009)
  - Spain: Penagos (Cabarceno Natural Park, 1990)
  - Sweden: Smålandet (Markaryds Älg & Bison Safari)
- Oceania
  - Australia
    - South Australia: Monarto (Monarto Safari Park, 1983)
    - Victoria: Werribee (Werribee Open Range Zoo, 1983)

== See also ==
- SimSafari: a computer game simulating the management of a safari park
- Effects of the car on societies
