= Africam Safari =

Zoo in Puebla, Mexico

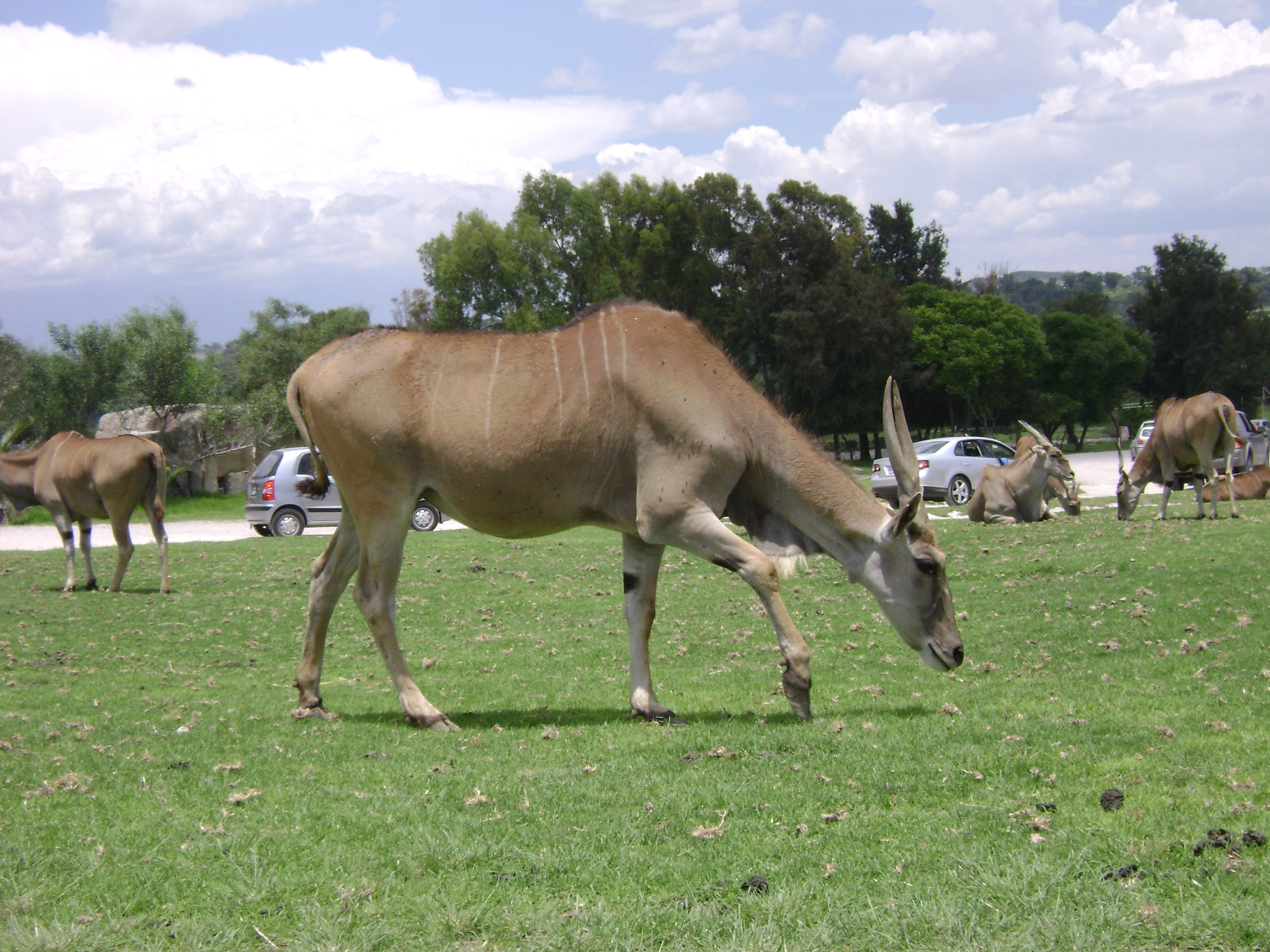
- Common eland with visitor cars in the background
- Interactive map of Africam Safari
- 18.9371194°N 98.1367064°W
- Date opened: 1972
- Location: Puebla, Mexico
- No. of animals: 2500
- No. of species: 350
- Memberships: AZA, WAZA
- Website: www.africamsafari.com.mx

Africam Safari is a Mexican safari park that was established in 1972 by Captain Carlos Camacho Espíritu. It is about 17 kilometres (11 miles) from the city of Puebla, Mexico.

Africam Safari is accredited by the Association of Zoos and Aquariums (AZA) and the World Association of Zoos and Aquariums (WAZA).

== History ==
Africam Safari started as a private animal collection owned by Carlos Camacho Espíritu, a veteran, pilot, radio host and business man, who lived in Valsequillo, Puebla. Camacho got the idea to create a park where animals could develop and reproduce their species in areas resembling their habitat in the wild. Camacho called this zoo prototype Africam, a portmanteau of Africa (continent where most of the species in the zoo come from) and his last name Camacho.

Africam Safari first opened to the public on April 2, 1972. Carlos Camacho died on October 28, 1976.

== Animal collection and sections ==
=== Safari ===
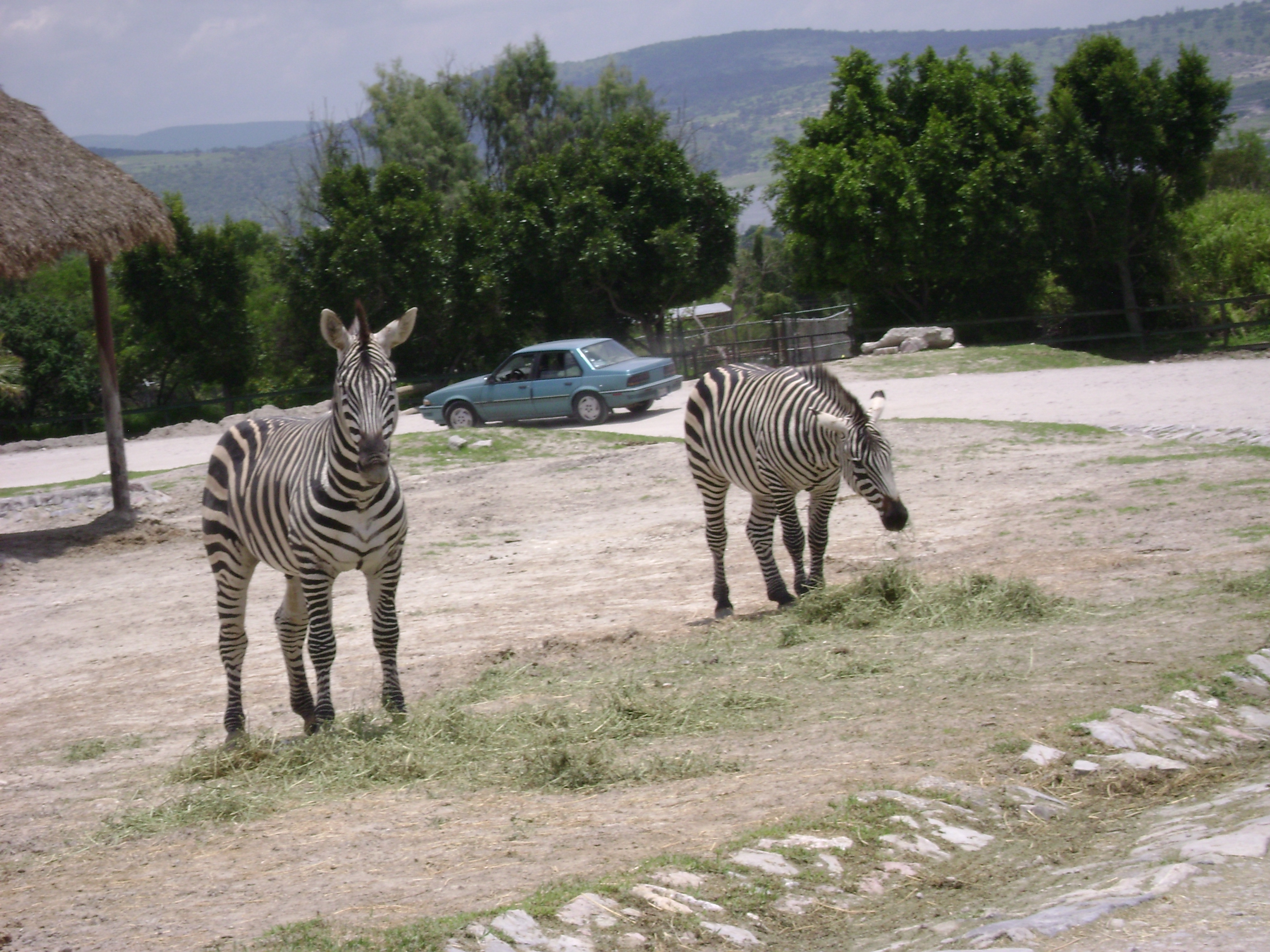
Grant's zebras at Africam Safari

Visitors to the park become immersed in the animal habitats, which very closely resemble the wild. The animals roam freely and the visitors can observe them from their own vehicles or the park's guided buses. Africam Safari has several habitats, including African Savannah, American steppes, Tropical Jungle, Mexican Forest, Tiger Lake, Lion Territory and walk-through adventure zone. There are approximately 2500 animals of 350 species that roam freely in a habitat which is said to encourage animal development and reproduction. There are signals next the way that prevent the visitor from animal attacks, advising the visitor to close the window and not to disturb the animals.

- Delta de Okavango: an area based on the Okavango Delta in Botswana, where mostly animals from the African steppes, savannah grasslands, Malagasy gallery forests and Andean regions are found in the park. This section is home to reticulated giraffes, black-and-white ruffed lemurs, ring tailed lemurs, African elephants, helmeted guineafowls, common elands, waterbucks, impalas, Egyptian geese, ostriches, nilgais, sable antelopes, llamas, mouflons, Barbary sheep, capibaras, Baird's tapirs, and Asian elephants.
- Oasis: this section is not based on a specific area in the world, it resembles an oasis in American rainforests. This section is home to military and scarlet macaws.
- Desierto de Kalahari: an area based on Kalahari Desert in Southern Africa, where mostly animals from Central Africa, India and the Caribbean are found. This section includes white rhinoceros, Grant's zebras, blue wildebeests, lechwes, Cape buffalo, black crowned cranes, sarus crane, dromedary, black rhinoceros and flamingos.
- Serengeti: an area based on Serengeti in Tanzania, where only African lions are found.
- Bakuli: an area based on forests in Bhutan, Vietnam and India. This section is home to chital, fallow deer, scimitar oryx, Nubian ibex and sika deer.
- Huasteca: an area based on La Huasteca in San Luis Potosí, where animals from Mexican forests are found. This section is home to the American black bear, Coyote, white-tailed deer, collared peccary and Canada goose.
- Chitwan: an area based on Chitwan District in Nepal, where Indian animals are found. This section is home to Bengal tigers, wild Asian water buffalo, gaur, blackbuck and chital.
- Zona de Descanso (Rest Zone): an area where visitors are allowed to leave their vehicles to use the park services (restaurant, public toilets, gift shop and snack bar). There are four exhibits where hippopotamus, chimpanzees, spectacled bears, and striped hyaenas can be found.
- Yellowstone: an area based on Yellowstone National Park in Wyoming where North American species can be found. This section is home to American bison and elk.

=== Adventure Zone ===
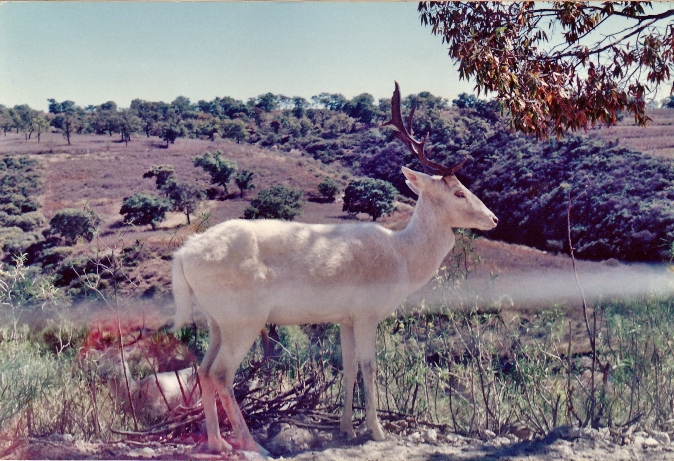
White fallow deer and habitat view

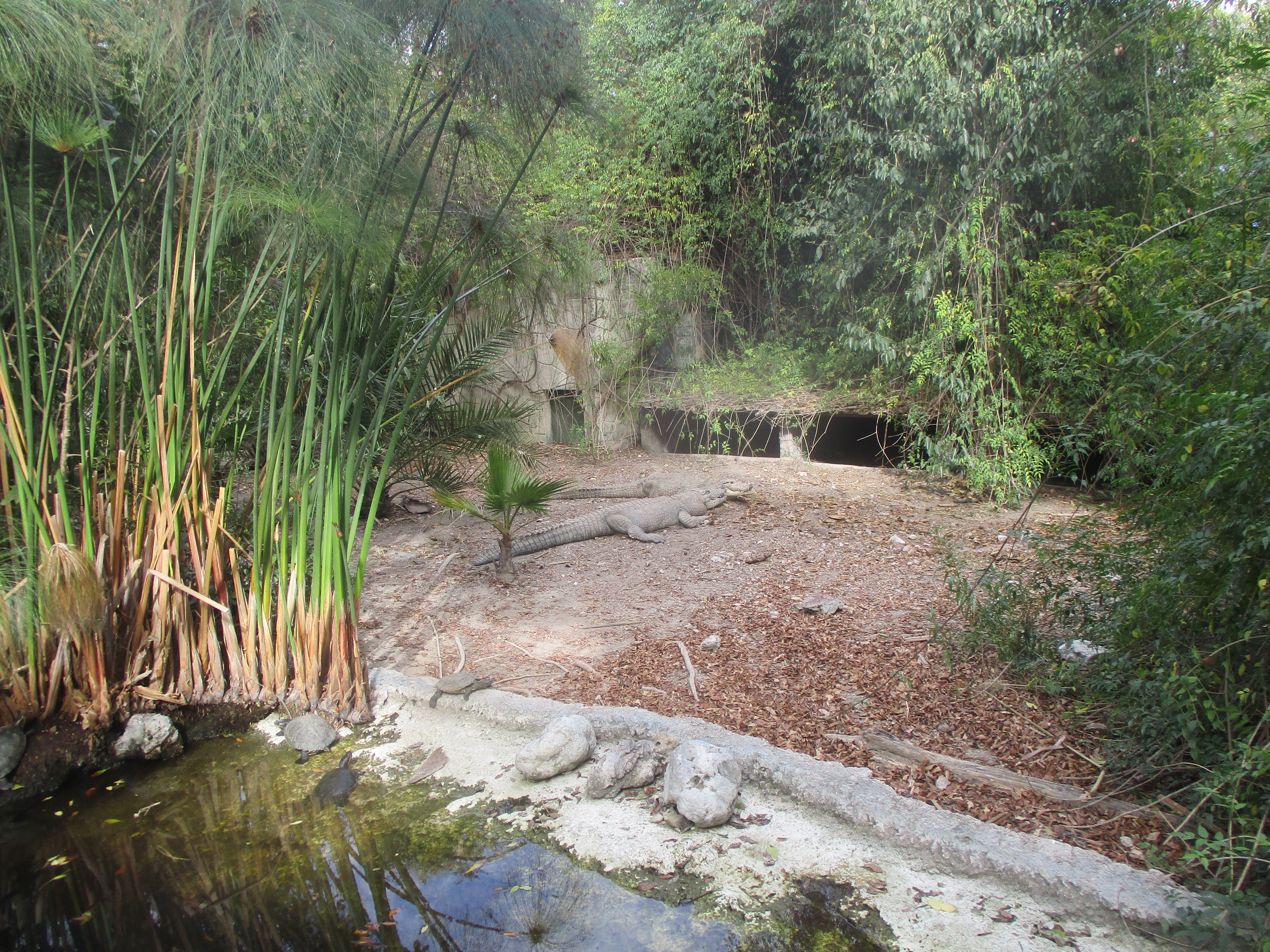
Crocodiles in Africam Safari

The Zona de Aventuras (Adventure Zone) is a section in the park where vehicles are not allowed and visitors must walk to get in different areas.

- Zona Australiana (Australian Zone): an area based on the Outback in Australia, where Australian animals are found. This section is home to the red kangaroos, red-necked wallabies, emus, dingos, black swans, budgerigars, diamond doves and sunda zebra finches.
- Aventura Amazónica (Amazonian Adventure): an area based on both the Amazon rainforest and the Maya Region, where Central and South American animals are found. This section is home to jaguars, spectacled caimans, red-bellied piranhas, fruit bats and a butterfly zoo named "X-Mahana" where monarch butterflies are raised.
- Jardín Botánico Louise Wardle de Camacho: a botanical garden that shows Mexican plant species, mostly regional cactus, agaves and a holm oak forest. Louise Wardle de Camacho was Carlos Camacho's wife.
- Tarántulas y Otros "Bichos" (Tarantulas and Other "Bugs"): is a herpetarium and insectarium that shows reptiles, amphibians and arthropods.

This section is home also to giant anteaters, agouti, red pandas, Chilean flamingo peacocks, spider monkeys, Morelet's crocodiles, prairie dogs, southern screamer, tufted capuchins, scarlet macaws, meerkats, African spurred tortoise, kinkajous, blue tegu, hamadryas baboons, trumpeter hornbills, highland guan, gray brocket, African porcupines, rhinoceros hornbills, gray Mexican wolf, Indian pythons, crocodile monitor, savannah monitor, squirrel monkeys, red-handed tamarin, horned guan, patas monkey, big hairy armadillo and great horned owl.

=== Nocturnal Safari ===
From December to January visitors can stay longer at the park, take a bus through the main sections at night, and watch the animals when they are more active. The lions, antelopes, hippopotamuses, buffalo, and tigers are much more active during this nocturnal tour. The Adventure Zone is also open during this time, with night activities.

== Conservation ==
Captain Carlos Camacho Espiritu created Africam with the purpose of creating a community conscience about the protection of animals. It is one of the few such establishments in Latin America which includes white tigers in its list of animals.

Africam Safari was the first institution in Mexico to successfully assist reproduction of the golden eagle, which is pictured on the Mexican flag. The Safari maintains a captive population of the tuxtla quail-dove, and have been very successful in breeding this endangered species. Other conservation programs in the wild in which Africam Safari is involved: jaguar in the northern Mexican mountains, humpback whales in the Pacific Ocean, flamingos the Yucatán Peninsula, Mexican military macaw, sea lions off the Mexican Pacific Coast, manatee in Quintana Roo, and many others.
