= Safari Ravenna =

Safari park and zoo in Italy

Coordinates: 44.327°N 12.275°E

- Interactive map of Safari Ravenna
- Type: Zoo, Safari park
- Location: Ravenna, Italy
- Area: 340.000 m2
- Created: 2012
- Status: Open all year

Safari Ravenna is a safari park and zoo in Ravenna, Emilia-Romagna, Italy, created in 2012 near the amusement park of Mirabilandia; extending over an area of 340.000 square metres. There is a large area for large mammals and birds to be seen only by car or train, and a smaller traditional zoo with the Reptile section, Primates, Australian section and domestic animals.
