= African Safari Wildlife Park =

Safari park in Port Clinton, Ohio, US

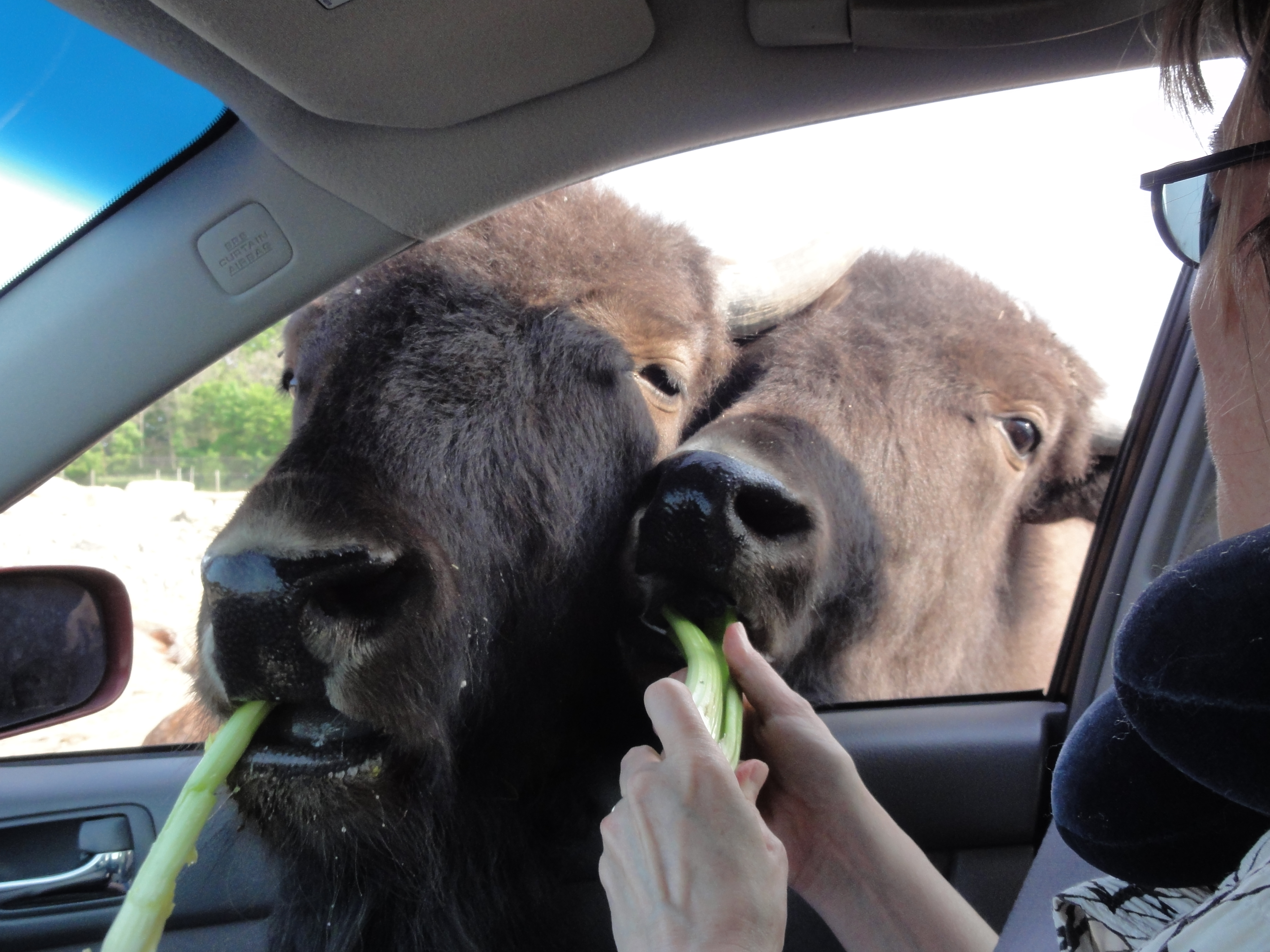
- A visitor feeding Bison at the park.
- Interactive map of African Safari Wildlife Park
- 41.518089°N 82.851634°W
- Date opened: 1973
- Location: Port Clinton, Ohio
- Land area: 100 acres (40 ha)
- No. of species: 50
- Website: www.africansafariwildlifepark.com

The African Safari Wildlife Park is a drive through wildlife park near Port Clinton, Ohio, United States. Visitors can drive through the 65-acre (26 ha) preserve and watch and feed the animals from their car. Visitors can spend as much time in the preserve as they wish, observing and feeding the animals, before proceeding to the walk through part of the park, called Safari Junction. The park is closed during the winter.

The park considers itself to be one of the leaders in conservation efforts for the animals it supports. Current breeding efforts are focused on the alpaca, white zebra, giraffe, and giant eland.

On November 28, 2019, a large fire erupted in a barn where some of the animals were kept, killing 10 animals. An investigation by the State Fire Marshal ruled that the cause was undetermined, but was not from criminal activity. The park re-opened on May 14, 2020.

== Exhibits ==
The park consists of the Safari, where visitors drive through the animal's habitat, and a walk through section called Safari Junction.

In the Safari, visitors drive through the preserve, and could see more than 50 species in their natural habitat. The species in the preserve include giraffes, zebras (including the rare white zebra), buffalo, alpaca, llama, warthogs, deer, elk, bison, dromedary and Bactrian camels, and giant eland. Many of the animals will come right up to the cars to investigate and to be fed. The park provides one container of food for each car, and additional food can be purchased. Visitors can drive around the preserve as often as they wish.

Safari Junction includes the Mombasa Food pavilion, Simba Lodge Gift Shop, Pork Chop Downs (pig races), educational shows, and camel rides. It also includes an American alligator, red kangaroos, tortoises and a gibbon island.
