= Lee G. Simmons Wildlife Safari Park =

Wildlife park in Nebraska, US

- Interactive map of Lee G. Simmons Wildlife Safari Park
- 41.01°N 96.299°W
- Date opened: 5 June 1998
- Location: Ashland, Nebraska, United States
- Land area: 440 acres
- Annual visitors: 143,668 in 2015
- Memberships: AZA
- Major exhibits: Elk Prairie, Deer Woods, Pelican Wetlands, Eagle Aviary, Wolf Canyon, Crane Meadows, Bison Plains
- Website: www.wildlifesafaripark.com

The Lee G. Simmons Wildlife Safari Park is a 440 acre drive-through wildlife park located near the town of Ashland, Nebraska, United States. The Park includes scenic prairies and wetlands that feature dozens of native North American animals including bison, elk, cranes and new Wolf Canyon overlook along with tram rides and a visitor center. The park is affiliated with Henry Doorly Zoo, and is located 22 miles west at Nebraska's I-80 exit 426.

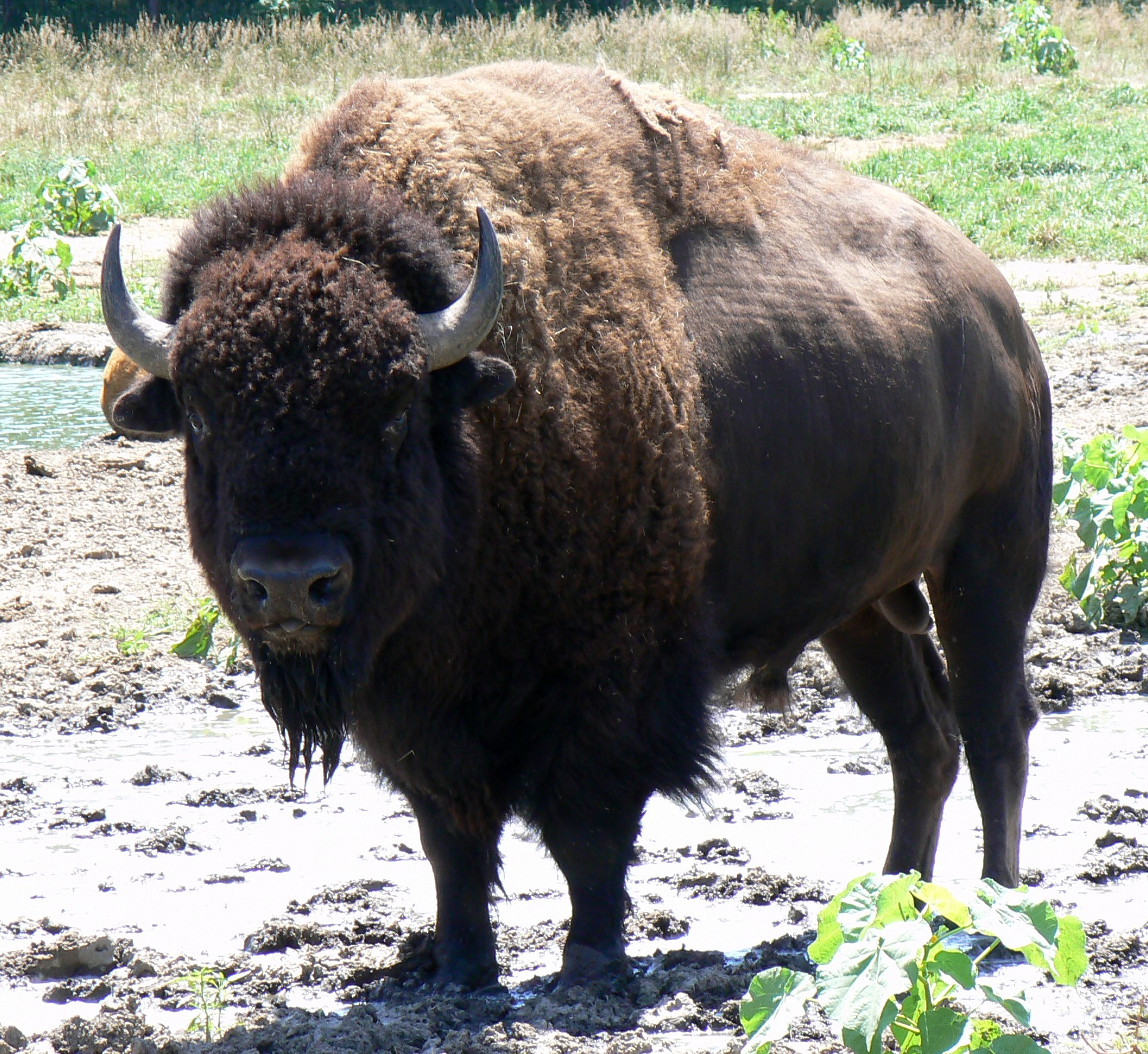
Bison bull

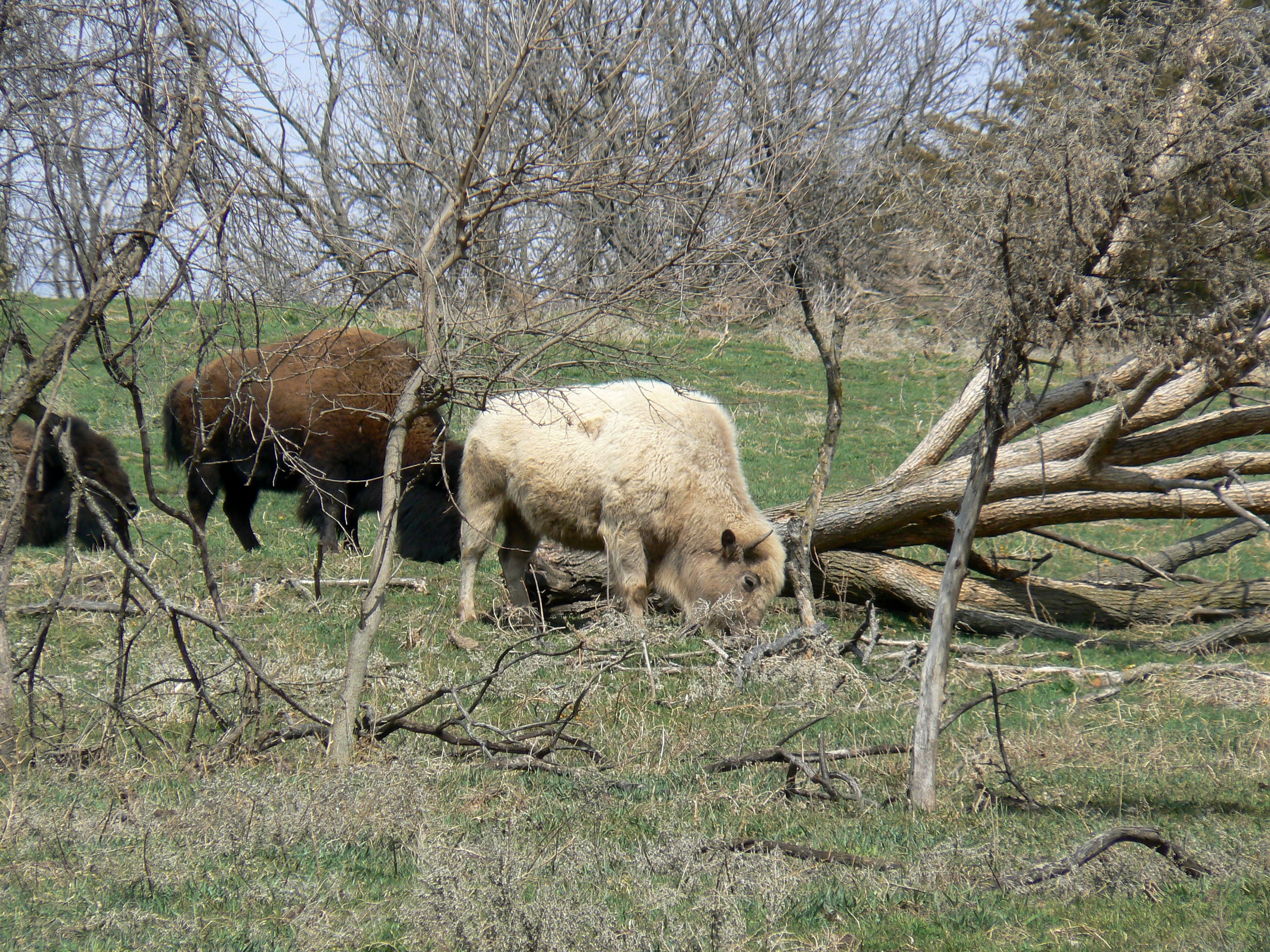
Blonde bison

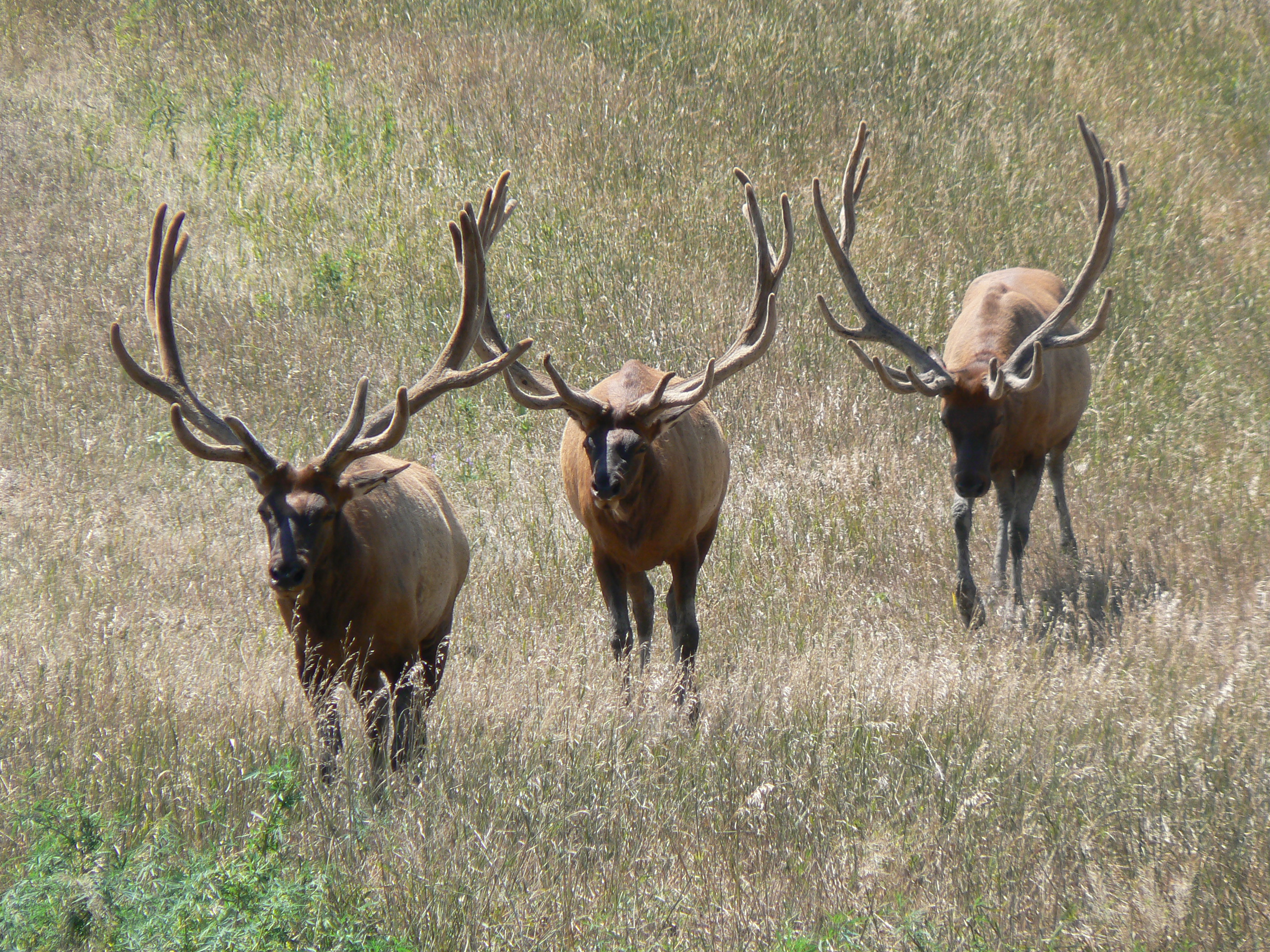
Elk

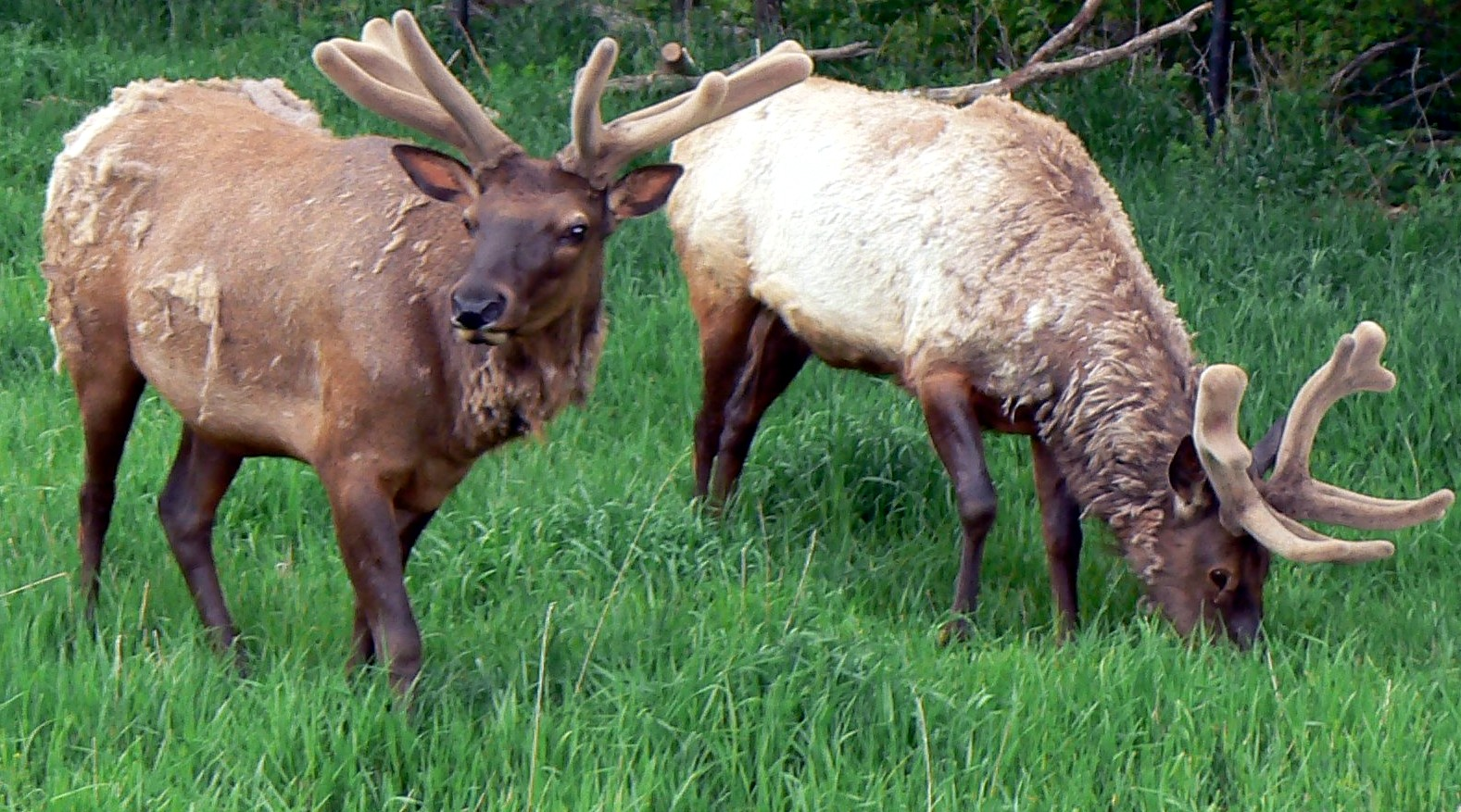
Elk

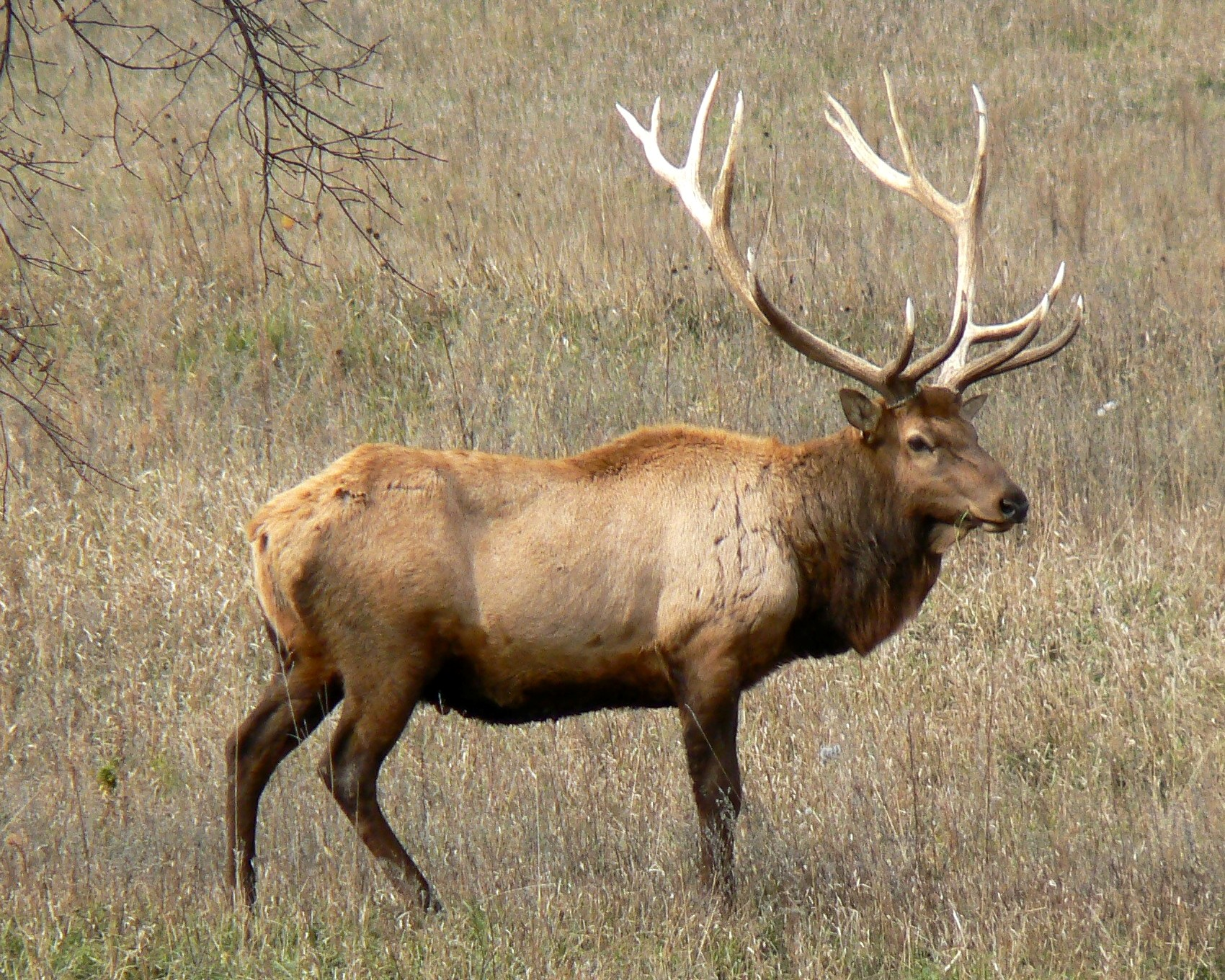
Elk

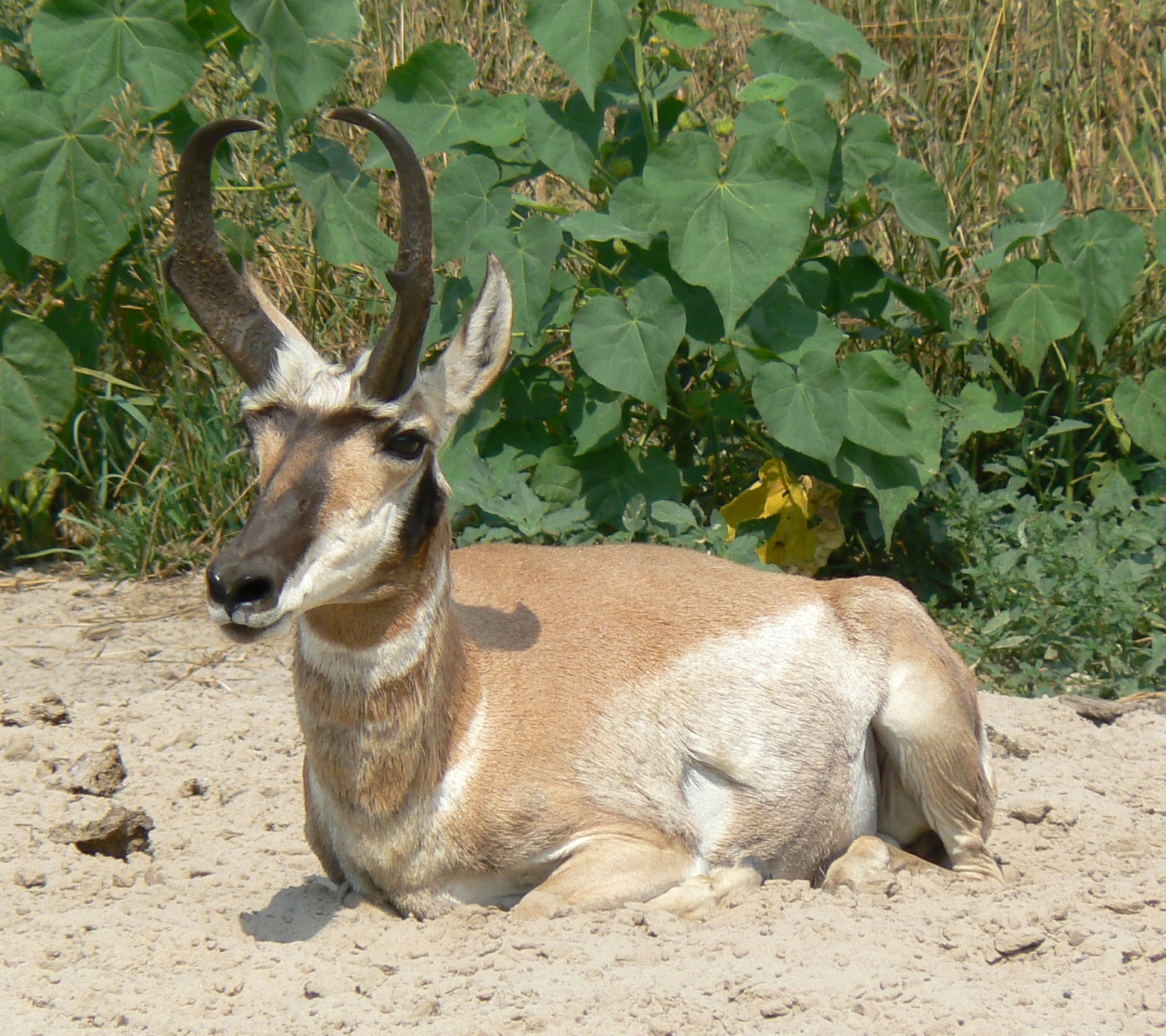
Male pronghorn

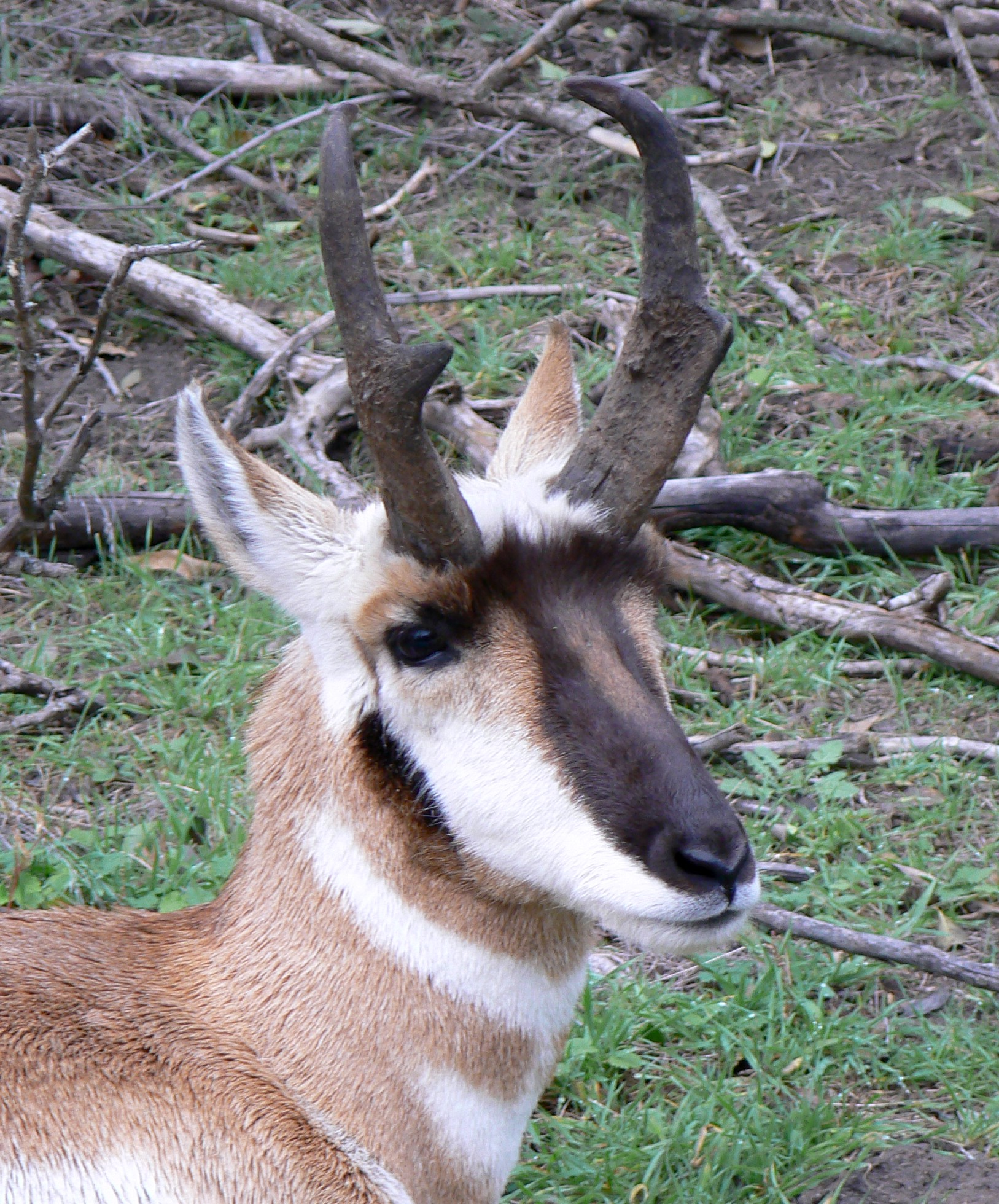
Pronghorn

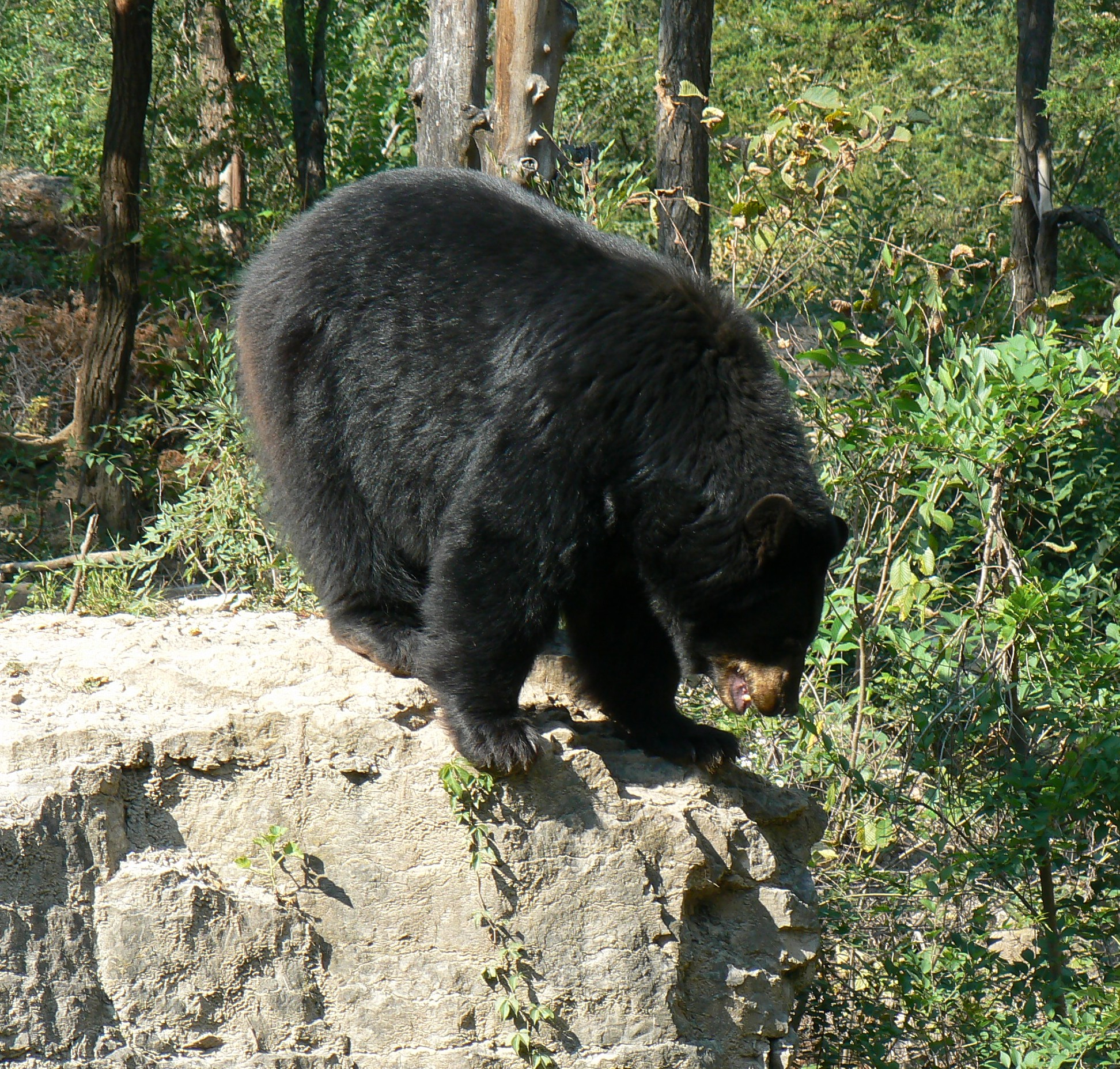
American black bear (Ursus americanus)

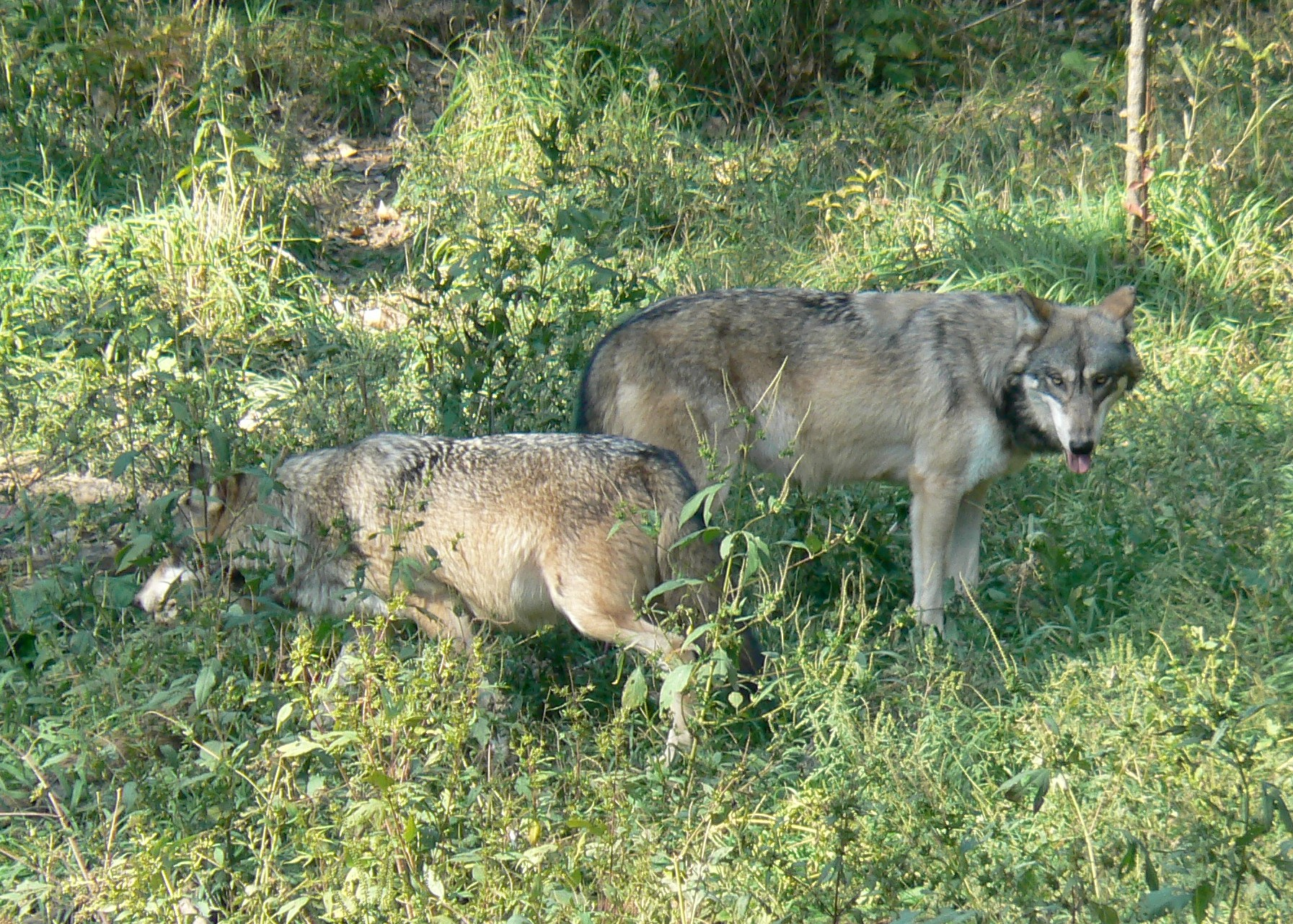
Grey wolves

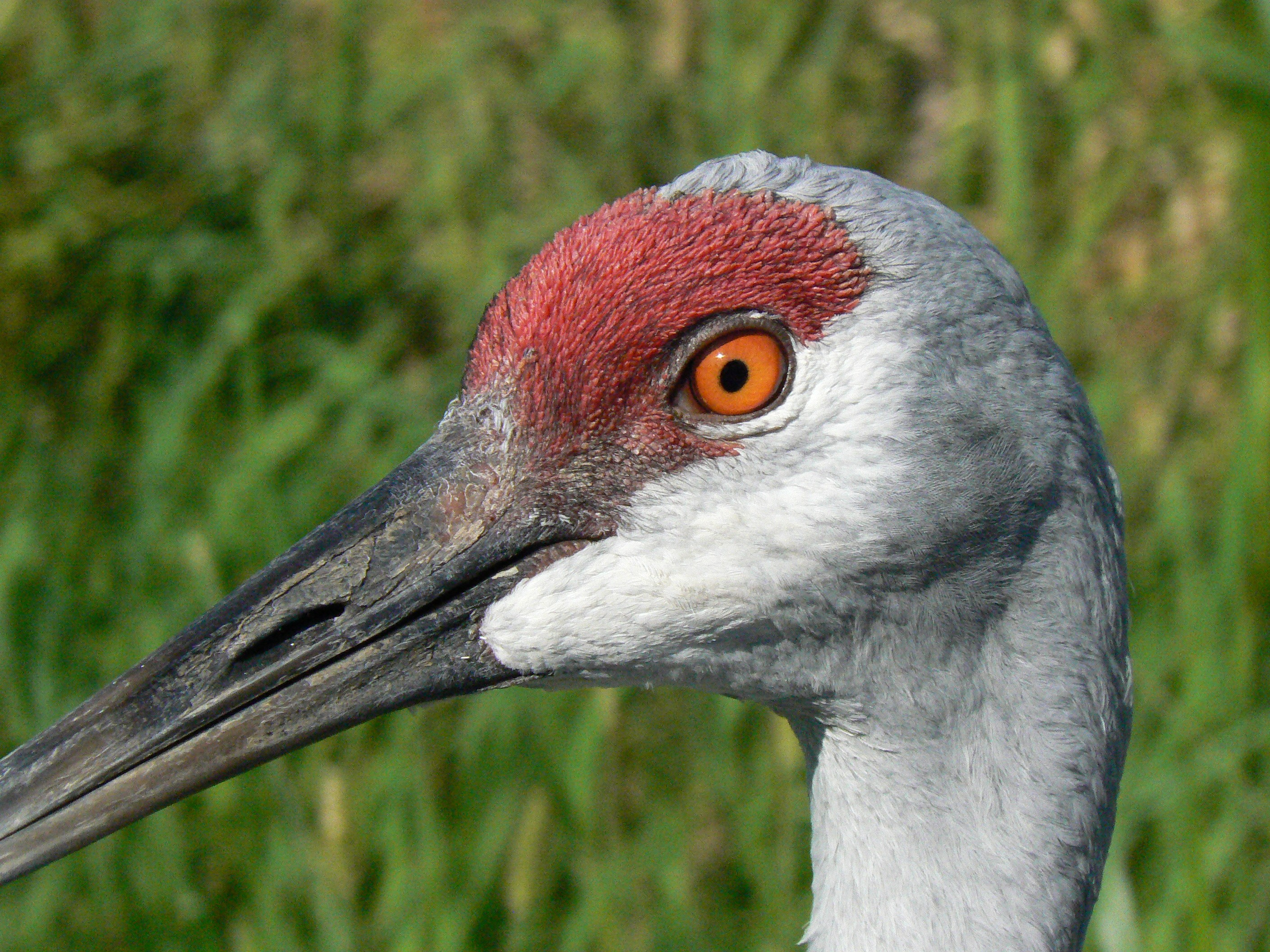
Sandhill crane

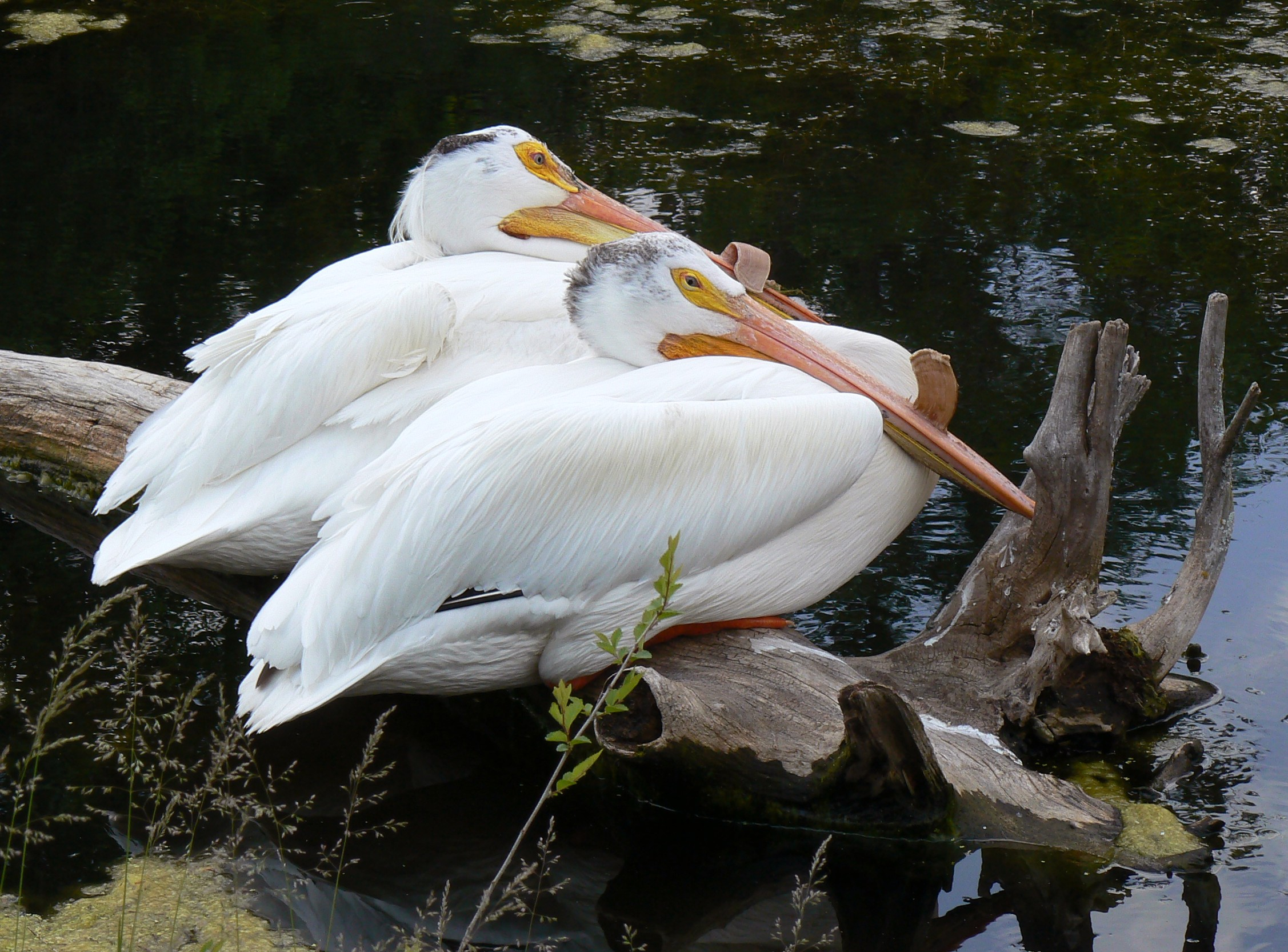
Pelicans

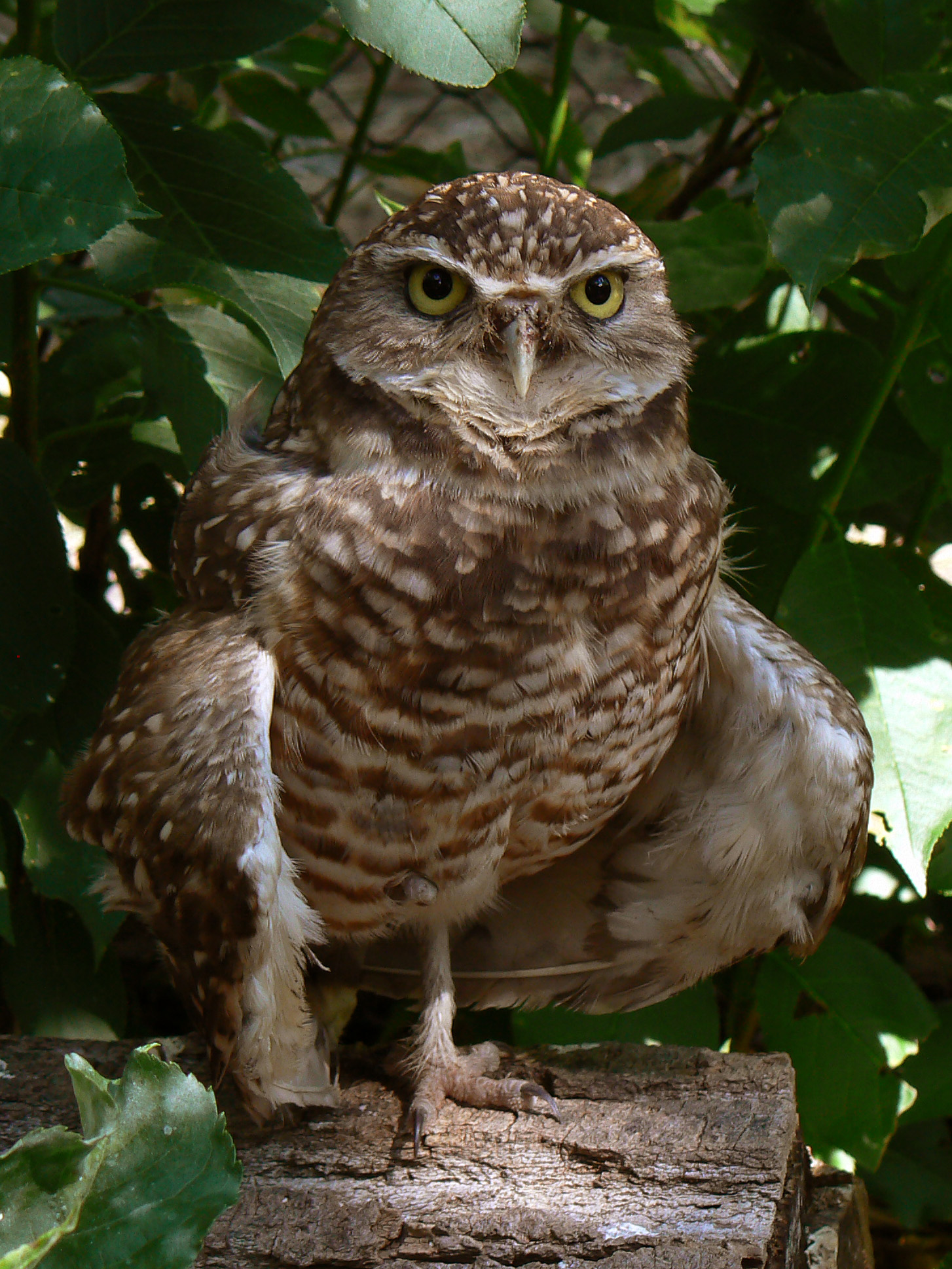
Burrowing owl
