= Givskud Zoo =

Zoo in Denmark

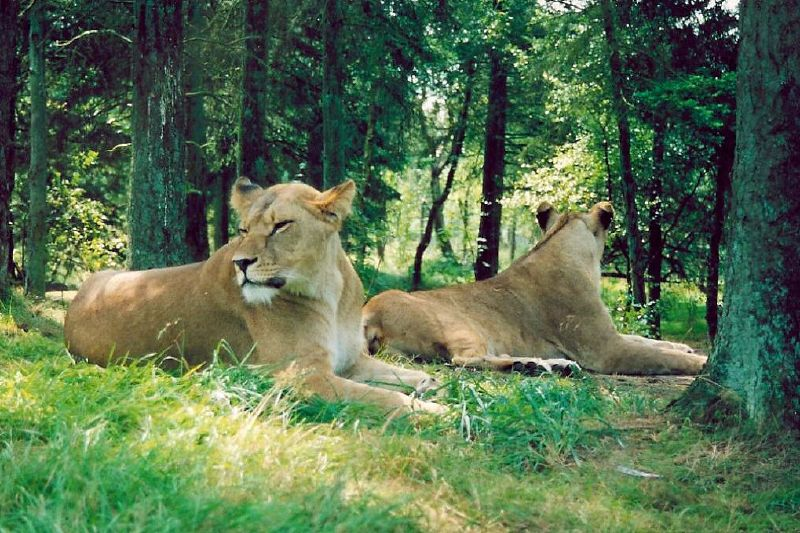
- Lions in Givskud Zoo
- Interactive map of Givskud Zoo
- 55°48′42″N 9°21′7″E
- Date opened: August 12, 1969
- Location: Givskud, Denmark
- Land area: 120 hectares (300 acres)
- No. of species: About 70
- Annual visitors: 327,000 (2011)
- Memberships: EAZA, WAZA
- Website: www.givskudzoo.dk

Givskud Zoo is a zoo and safari park in Givskud, 20 kilometres (12 mi) north west of Vejle in Denmark. The park opened in 1969 under the name of "Løveparken" (the lion park) with lions as the only animals. In 1970 Asian elephants arrived and today the park has more than 700 animals representing more than 70 species. The zoo is one of only ten attractions to be awarded 5 stars by the Danish tourist guide Jyllands Attraktioner and receives about 325,000 visitors a year. It covers a total of 120 hectares (300 acres), including 65 hectares (160 acres) currently in use for the zoo and safaripark. It was announced in 2014 that the remaining area will become part of a future zoo, with first phase opening for the zoo's 50th anniversary in 2019, under the name Zootopia.

Givskud Zoo has been home to several famous animals, among them the white rhino Brutalis, who arrived in 1990 and was very aggressive towards stable equipment, other rhinos and humans (likely because he was brought up without contact with other rhinos, having been rejected by his mother shortly after his birth at Knowsley Safari Park in 1977). As a final solution, he was shipped to the private game reserve Ongava in Namibia in 1994. He lived in the reserve for 6 years before he died in a territorial battle with another male rhino. His story was covered in detail by the general media, as well as a children's book.

Another famous animal from the park is the silverback Samson, a western lowland gorilla, who has appeared several times on Danish TV. Samson and the other gorillas live in a 2 ha (4.9 acres) exhibit (one of the largest of its kind), which opened in 2000.

Givskud Zoo is best known for its large enclosures, which the guests can drive through in their own cars. Some of the most well known and popular animals in the zoo are Asian elephants, white rhinos, gorillas, and lions. As of March 2012, the large pride included a total of 45 lions.

After Zootopia was renamed to Zootropolis in certain European countries, it was reported that Disney made the decision in order to not overlap with Givskud Zoo's "Zootopia" trademark, although Disney claimed that the change was made "to merely allow the film to have a unique title that works for UK audiences."
