= Parco Safari delle Langhe =

Attraction in northern Italy

- Interactive map of Parco Safari delle Langhe
- Type: Safari Park, Zoo, Amusement park
- Location: Murazzano, Italy
- Coordinates: 44°29′38″N 8°01′45″E
- Area: 700.000 m2
- Created: 1976
- Status: Open all year

Parco Safari delle Langhe is a safari park, zoo and amusement park in Murazzano, Piedmont, northern Italy, created in 1976 and extending over an area of 700,000 square metres.
