= High Delta Safari Park =

Safari park in Delhi, Louisiana

High Delta Drive Thru Safari Park
- Interactive map of High Delta Drive Thru Safari Park
- 32.564°N 91.515°W
- Date closed: November 2009
- Location: Delhi, Louisiana
- Land area: 40 acres (16 ha)

The High Delta Drive Thru Safari Park was a 40-acre (16 ha) safari park located in Delhi in Richland Parish in northeastern Louisiana. The park was about midway between Vicksburg, Mississippi, and Monroe, Louisiana, located off Louisiana Highway 17 9 miles (14 km) north of the Interstate 20 Exit 153. The animal park featured exotic and endangered species.

== Animals ==
High Country Safari Park was auctioned off due to bankruptcy on 21 November 2009. The auctioneers listed the following animals as for sale at that time: "(21) species including: (approx count) (20) Watusi cattle; (1) American bison bull; (3) zebu; (6) Red Deer; (1) Blue Wildebeest (female); (10) Pere David's deer; (2) Dromedary camels; (10) elk; (4) donkeys; (7) water buffalo; (6) Barasingha deer; (6) Grant's zebras, ((1) stallion, (3) mares, (1) foal); (30) Fallow deer (mostly bucks); (18) Sika deer; (4) Emus; (10) Rhea; (1) Zedonk; (2) Yaks, (male & female); (1) Llama; (9) goats; (10) Pot bellied pigs; (1) 17’ Python, (female); (1) Scarlet Macaw, (female); (2) Tortoise."

At one point this drive thru zoo boasted of the largest herds of the white-bearded Wildebeest and scimitar horned oryx in the State of Louisiana, and claimed to be the only licensed breeder of the Barasingha (an endangered species). It claimed to be located on "2,000 acres (810 ha) of Northern Louisiana's most picturesque landscape", though only 40 acres (16 ha) was evidently sold at auction.

== Reopening ==
The park was purchased and reopened by the new ownership and is now operating as Wild Country Safari Park. Wild Country offers many of the same attractions as the previous park with the addition of an enhanced petting zoo, larger diversity of species of animals throughout, and an interactive small animal and reptile room.
