= Réserve Africaine de Sigean =

Réserve africaine de Sigean
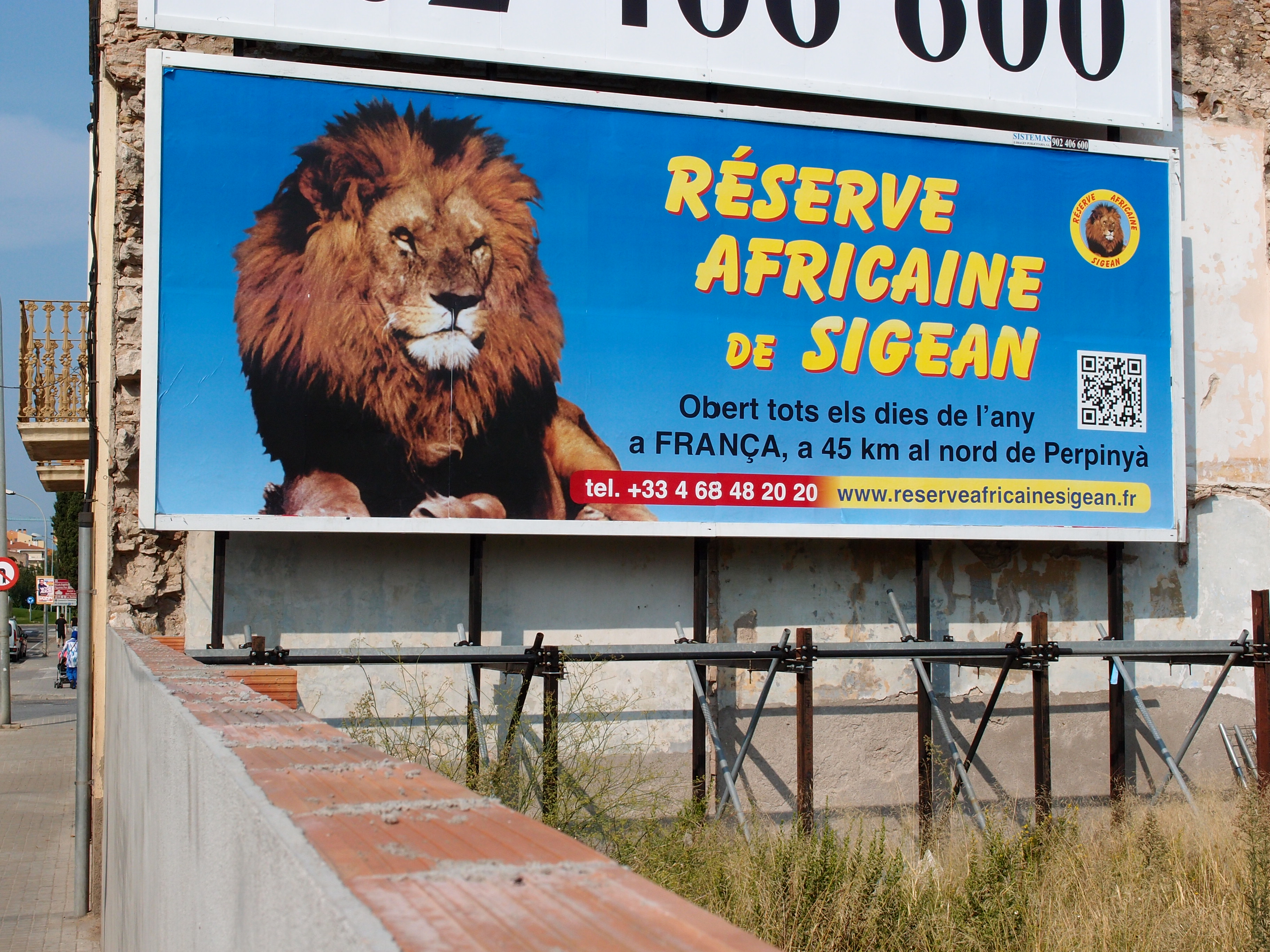
- Interactive map of Réserve africaine de Sigean
- 43°4′5.29″N 2°57′12.83″E
- Date opened: April 8th 1974
- Location: Sigean (Languedoc-Roussillon)
- Land area: 300 Hectare
- No. of animals: 3 800
- No. of species: 160
- Memberships: EAZA
- Owner: Jean-Jacques Boisard
- Website: www.reserveafricainesigean.fr

The Réserve Africaine de Sigean is a 300-hectare (740-acre) zoo that opened in 1974 in Sigean, Aude, in the south of France.

The zoo is home to some 3,800 animals representing about 160 species, and is a member of the European Association of Zoos and Aquaria (EAZA) and the World Association of Zoos and Aquariums (WAZA).

== Collection ==
=== Driving Safari ===
The animals are held in spacious and naturalistic settings, with the typical Mediterranean vegetation already occurring on site.

Visitors can drive through the different exhibits in their own vehicles or in a guided drive.

The area is divided in eight parks, 1, 2 and 3 represent scrubland or bush; 4 and 5 are the predator enclosures and 6, 7 and 8 depict the savanna. Lar gibbons are held on an island in the background of the savanna exhibit.

1. African forest buffaloes, blesbok, sable antelopes and impalas
2. Common ostriches, blue wildebeest, springbok, Grévy's zebras and defassa waterbuck
3. Kordofan giraffes, roan antelopes, lowland nyalas and Nile lechwes.
4. A group of ten Asiatic black bears
5. African lions.
6. Eight Southern white rhinos, Nile lechwes and Speke's sitatungas
7. Grant's zebras, Watusi cattle, blue wildebeest, common ostriches and common elands
8. Somali wild asses, common warthogs and Cuvier's gazelles.

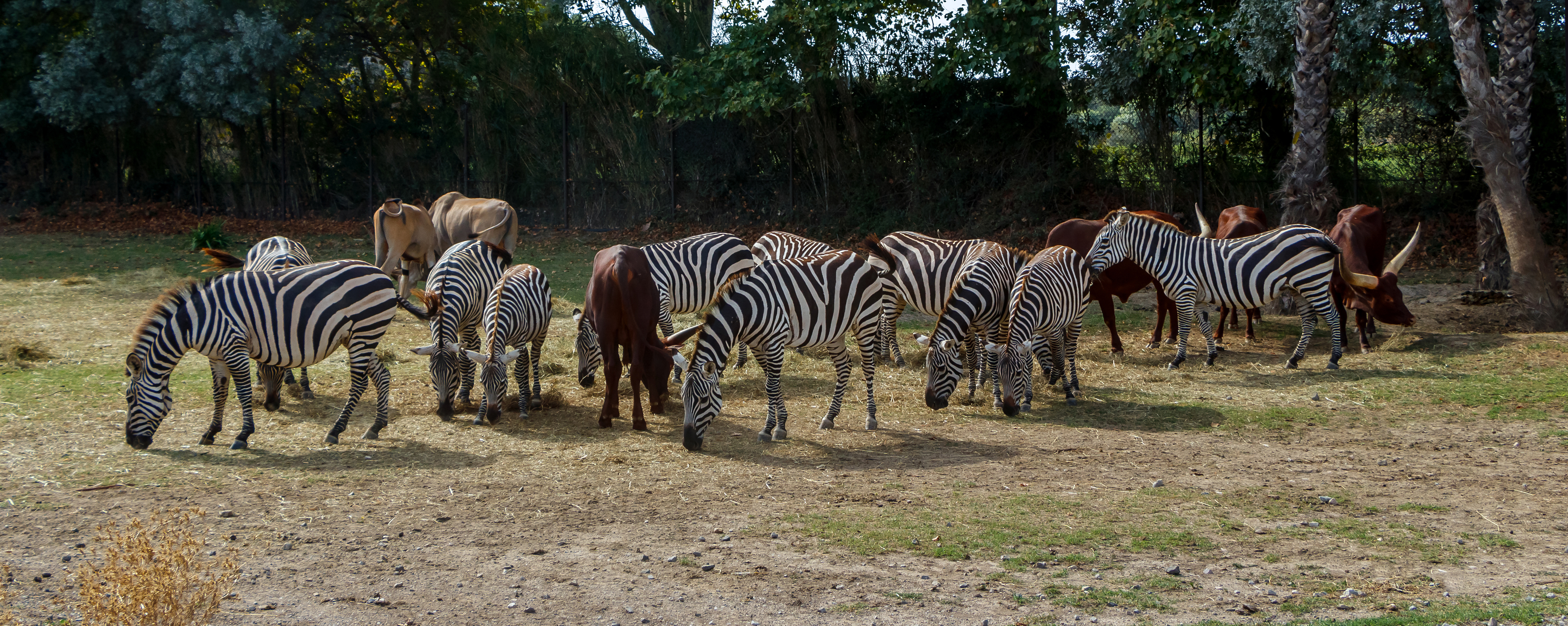
Grant's zebras with Watusi cattle and common eland

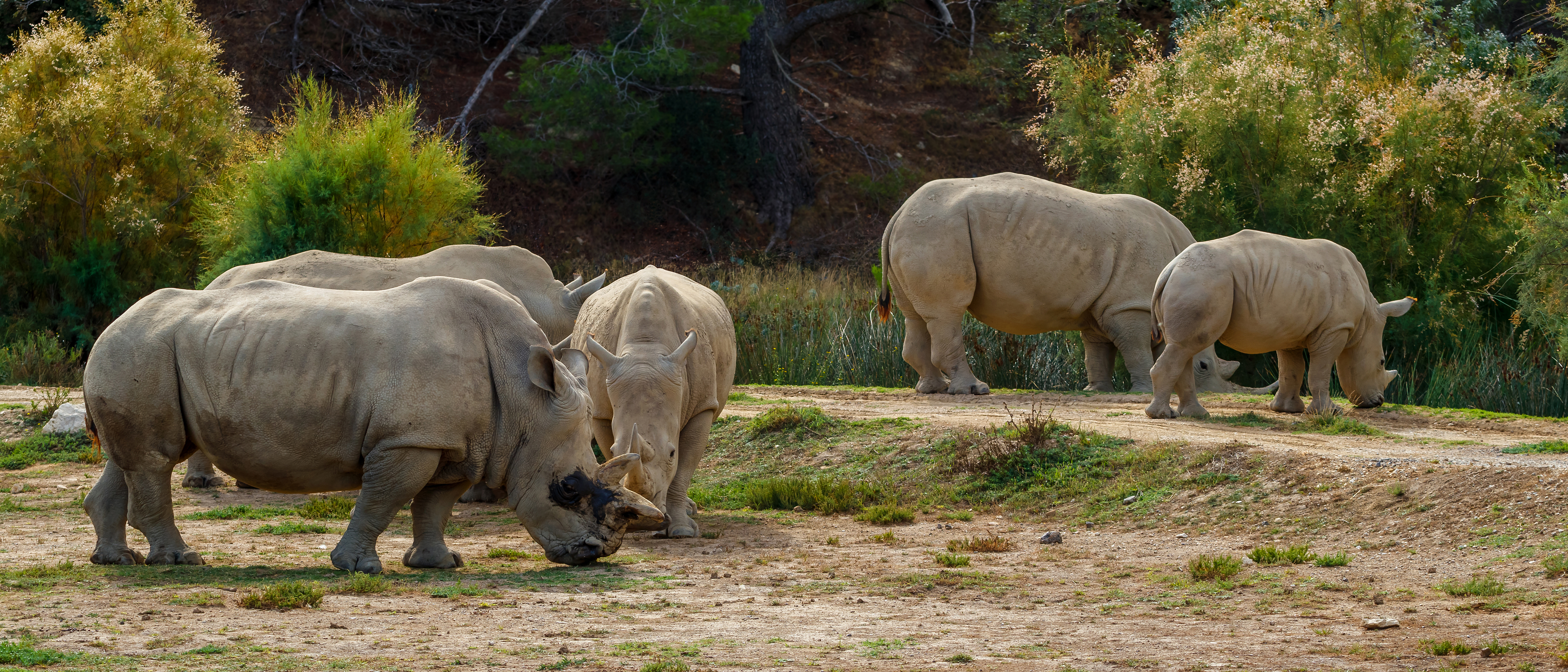
Southern White rhino

=== Walking Park ===
Laid around the Œil de Ca, this part has an array of pens holding many species of ungulates, birds and primates. Some of the species held are Barbary sheep, greater kudus, reticulated giraffes, Hartmann's mountain zebras, emus, greater rheas, black-capped squirrel monkeys, white-headed marmosets, Barbary macaques, dromedary camels, Persian onagers, macaws (blue-and-yellow, scarlet and green-winged), red river hogs, Cape porcupines, meerkats, African spurred tortoises, red-necked wallabies, Blackhead Persian sheep, Vietnamese pot-bellied pigs and African pygmy goats. There is also a small Africa-themed aviary and one for waldrapp. The chimpanzees live on two islands of about 2 hectares and can only be observed from afar and from a concealed tower to not disrupt their natural behavior. The last African elephant of the park, Csami, moved to Zoopark Erfurt in 2017.

Around the lakeshore, there is a large colony of wild-occurring greater flamingos and Chilean flamingos, pink-backed- and great white pelicans from the zoo. In the 1-hectare large Grande Volière, built in 2018, the zoo features Abdim's storks, African openbills, saddle-billed storks, Marabou storks, grey crowned cranes, goliath herons, hamerkops, African sacred ibises, hadada ibises, grey-cheeked hornbills, trumpeter hornbills, grey parrots, vulturine guineafowl, yellow-billed storks, Western plantain-eaters, hooded vultures, palm-nut vultures, Rüppell's vultures, African black ducks, blue-billed teals, cape teals, fulvous whistling ducks, white-faced whistling ducks, knob-billed ducks, red-crested turacos, yellow-necked spurfowl, speckled pigeons and Gabon talapoins. Since 2024, the zoo also has a pair of white-headed vultures.

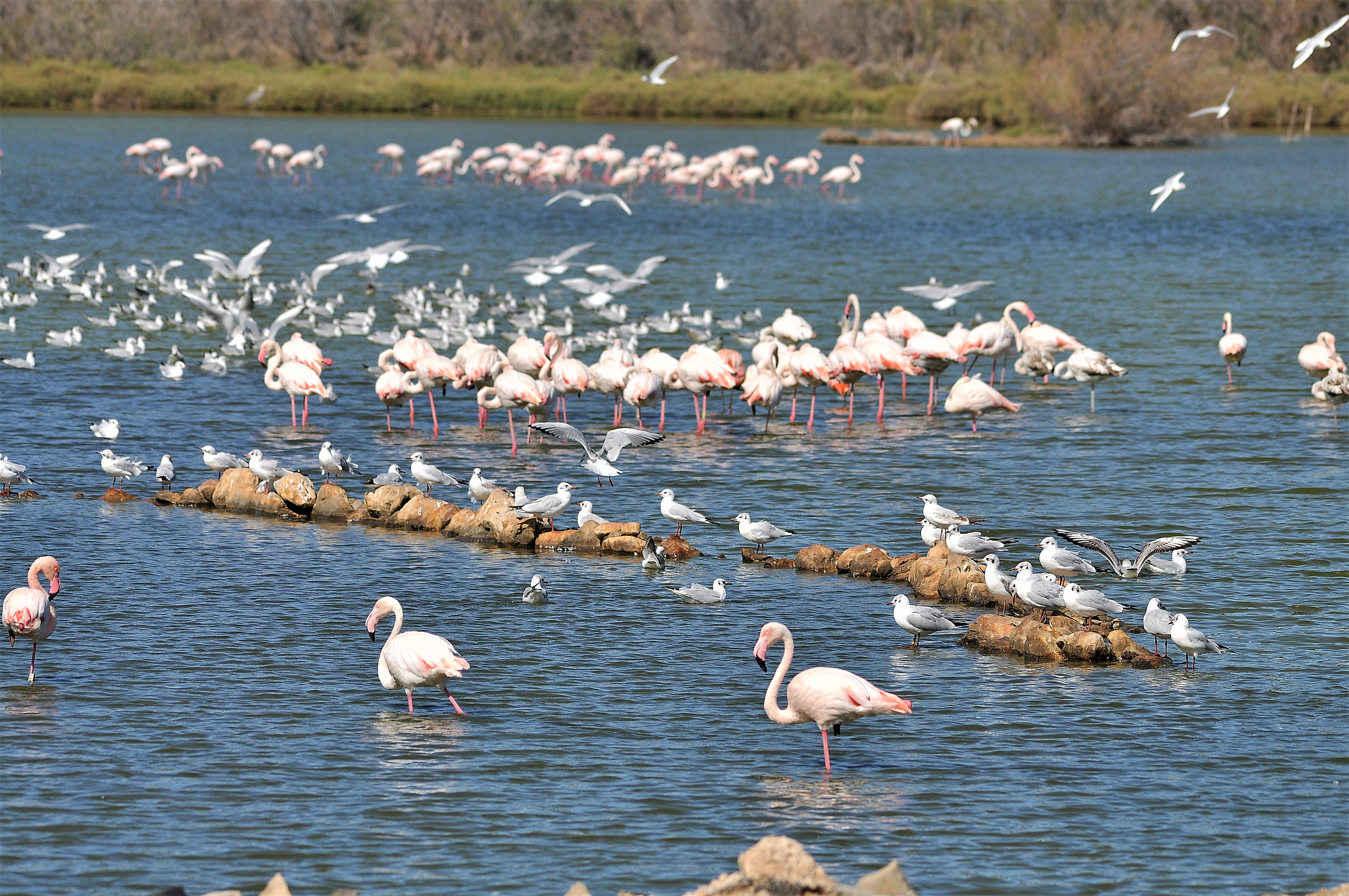
Greater flamingo colony

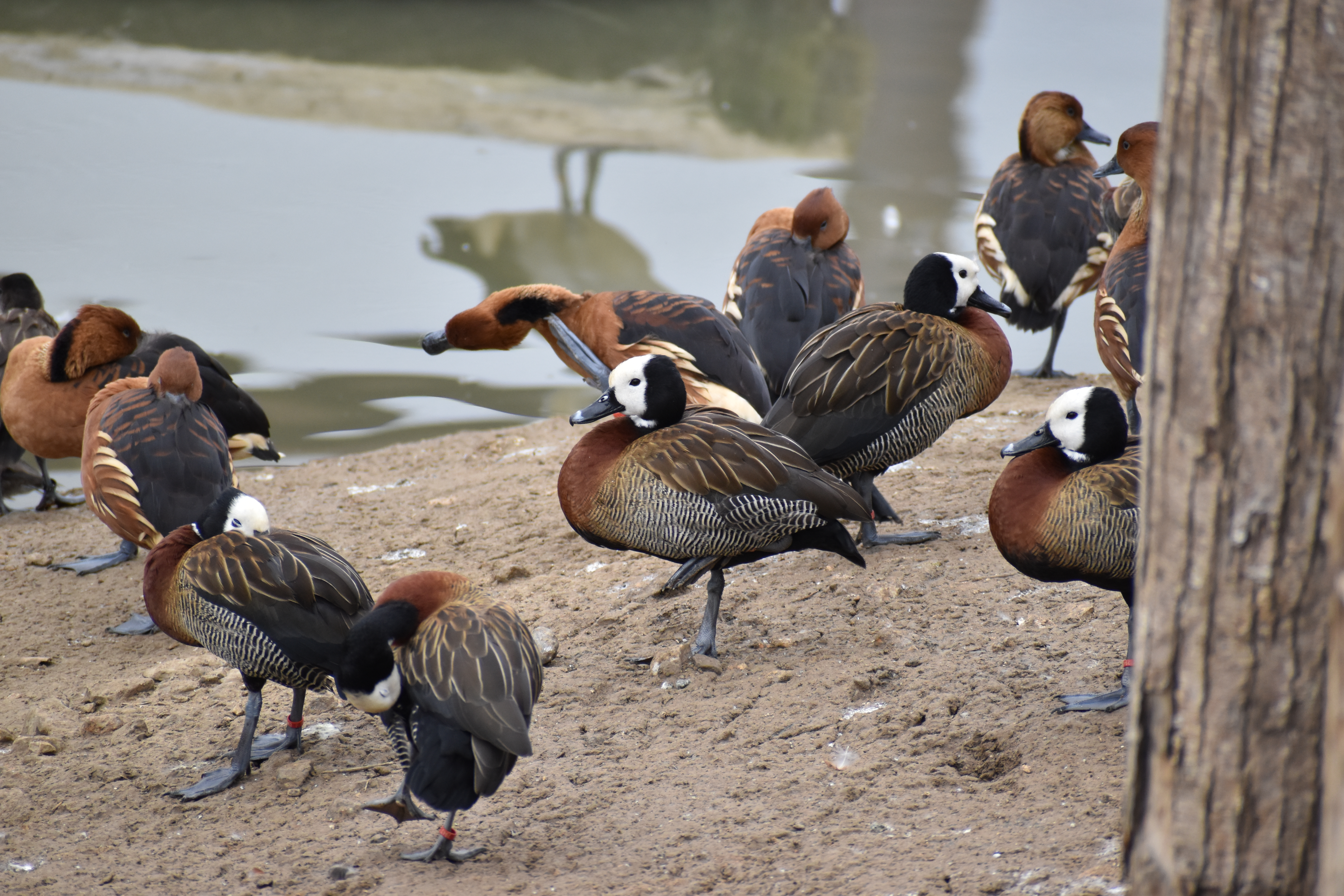
The two species of whistling duck in the Grande Volière

The Territoire des Carnivores, which opened in 2018, holds Southeast African cheetahs and African wild dogs.

There also is a tropical area with a vivarium, holding American alligators, black-capped squirrel monkeys, red-crested turacos, Dumeril's boas, Madagascar tree boas, four-horned chameleons, panther chameleons, Parson's chameleon, West African slender-snouted crocodiles, Nile monitors, dwarf crocodiles, black tree snakes, common flat-tail geckos, African helmeted turtles, fire skinks, Gabon vipers, green bush vipers, black-throated monitors, green iguanas, green keel-bellied lizards, Madagascar giant day geckos and cichlids. In the warmer months, the alligators live in the large free-flight aviary.

The 18-hectare large African Plains can be viewed from panoramic observatory. This enclosure features blue wildebeest, Grévy's zebras, gemsbok, common elands, lechwes, African forest buffaloes, greater kudus, Nile lechwes, springbok and common ostriches.

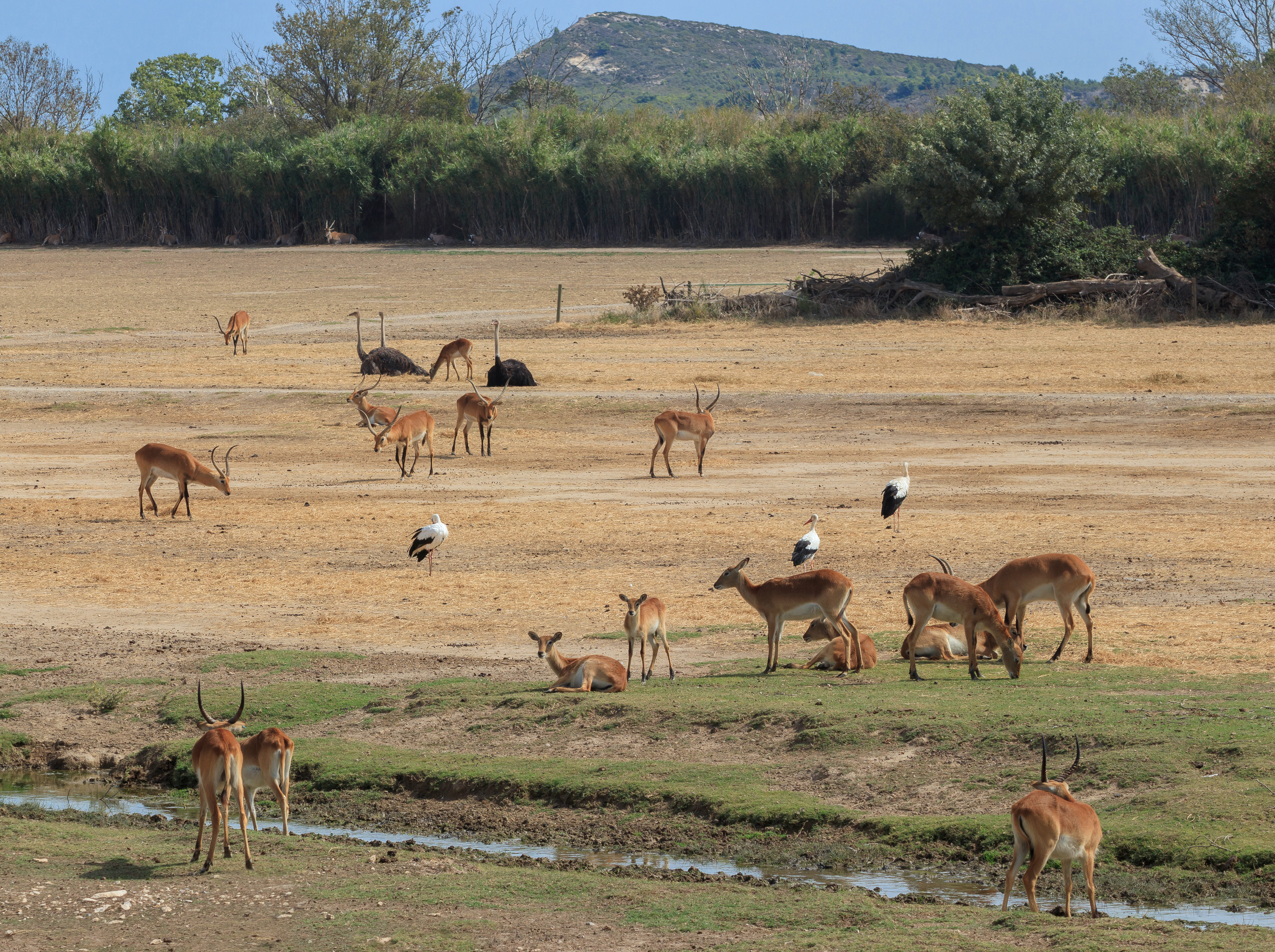
Lechwe, ostrich and white stork in the Pleine Africaine

== Conservation ==
The zoo participates in 47 breeding programs and coordinates the EAZA Ex situ Programme (EEP) of the Hartmann's mountain zebras (Equus zebra hartmannae). The zoo also breeds regularly other threatened species, for example the African wild dog, the Cuvier's gazelle and the Northern bald ibis.

In 2021, the zoo announced the first hatching of a North African ostrich in France, which also was the first naturally hatched individual of this Critically Endangered subspecies in Europe.
