= Givskud =

- Town
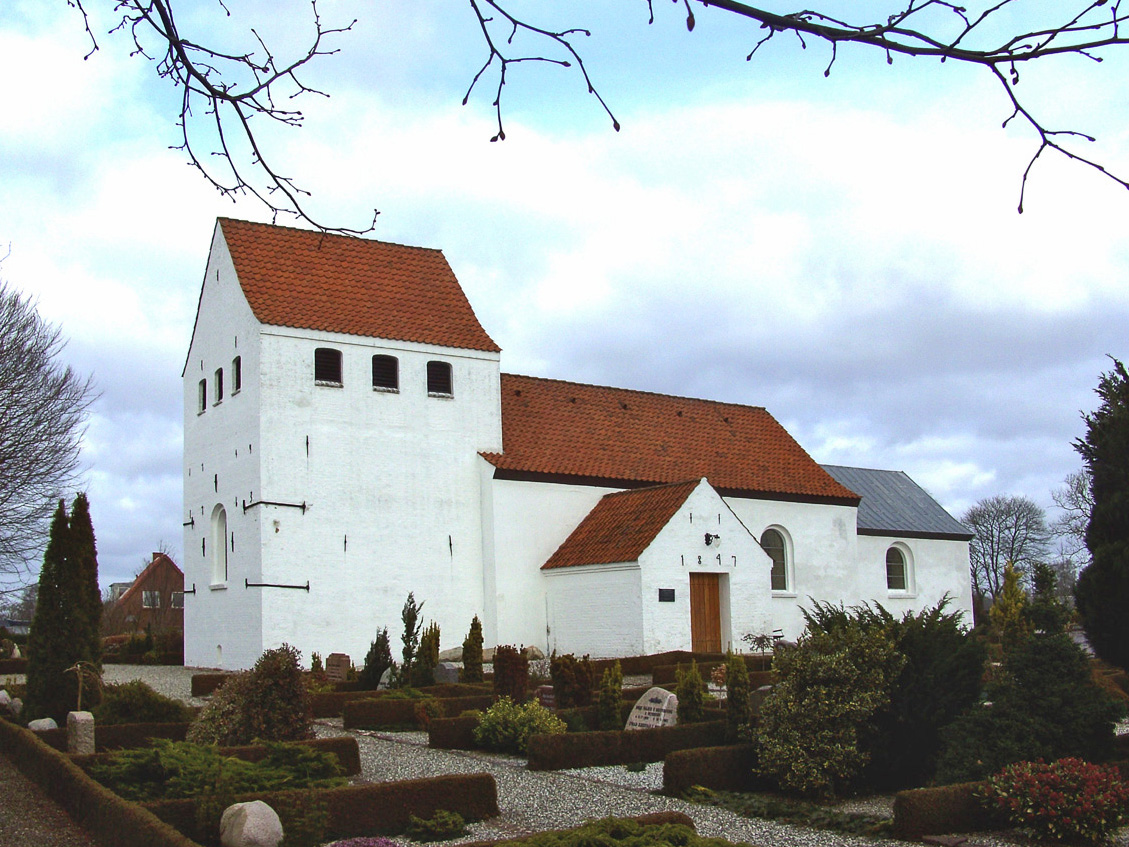
- Givskud Church

- Location in Region of Southern Denmark Givskud (Denmark)
- Coordinates: 55°48′57″N 9°20′49″E
- Country: Denmark
- Region: Southern Denmark
- Municipality: Vejle Municipality

Population (2026)
  - Total: 623

Givskud is a little town in southern Jutland with a population of 623 (1 January 2026). The town is located in Vejle Municipality in the Region of Southern Denmark.

Other than Givskud Church it consisted of only a few farms, a school and a rectory in the 19th century. Later an inn was built. It was not until 1969 that the village really came into public attention. It was that same year that the Givskud Zoo was established under the name Løveparken Givskud ("Givskud Lion Park") and was an innovation among zoos, with visitor being able to roam about with the lions in their own private cars. Later came giraffes, rhinos, bison, and elephants to the park, which today houses more than 100 species. Givskud Zoo is now a huge attraction in Jutland.

Givskud is located about 17 kilometres (11 mi) northwest of the regional and municipality seat of Vejle and about 9 kilometres (6 mi) southeast of the town Give.
