= Sigean =

Commune in Occitanie, France

- Commune
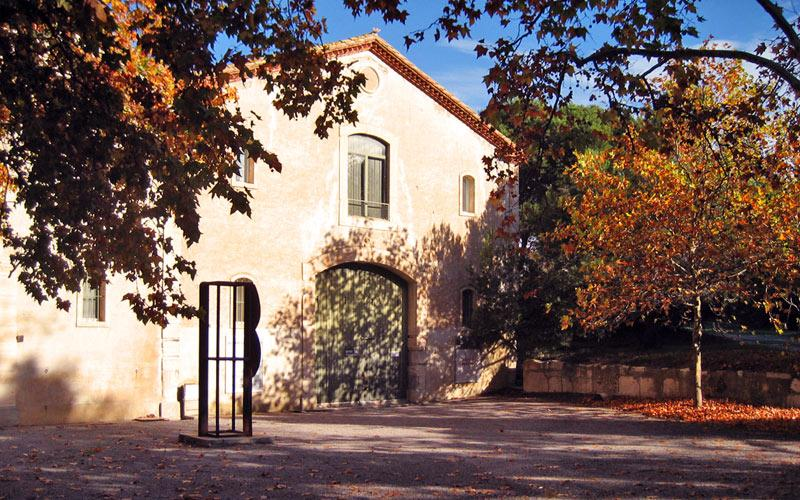
- Facade of L.A.C Lieu d'Art Contemporain, housed in a former winery

- Coat of arms
- Location of Sigean
- Location within France Location within Occitanie
- Coordinates: 43°01′45″N 2°58′42″E
- Country: France
- Region: Occitania
- Department: Aude
- Arrondissement: Narbonne
- Canton: Les Corbières Méditerranée
- Intercommunality: Grand Narbonne

Government
  - Mayor (2020–2026): Michel Jammes
- Area^{1}: 35.35 km^{2} (13.65 sq mi)
- Elevation: 17 m (56 ft)
- Highest elevation: 126 m (413 ft)
- Lowest elevation: 0 m (0 ft)
- Population (2023): 5,657
  - Density: 160.0/km^{2} (414.5/sq mi)
- Time zone: UTC+01:00 (CET)
  - Summer (DST): UTC+02:00 (CEST)
- INSEE/Postal code: 11379 /11130
- Website: www.sigean.fr (in French)
- ^{1} French Land Register data, which excludes lakes, ponds, glaciers > 1 km^{2} (0.386 sq mi or 247 acres) and river estuaries.

Sigean (French pronunciation: [siʒɑ̃]; Occitan: Sijan) is a commune in the Aude department in southern France. It formerly laid on Route nationale 9 between Narbonne and Perpignan, but RN 9 (downgraded to route départementale 6009) now bypasses the town of Sigean and is itself bypassed by the A9 autoroute. Sigean is also known as The Capital.

== Population ==
Historical population
Year	Pop.	±% p.a.
1968	3,033	—
1975	3,027	−0.03%
1982	3,058	+0.15%
1990	3,373	+1.23%
1999	4,049	+2.05%
2007	5,047	+2.79%
2012	5,476	+1.65%
2017	5,477	+0.00%
2023	5,657	+0.54%
Source: INSEE

== Culture ==
- The Musée des Corbières in Sigean is a museum dedicated to history and archaeology.
- The L.A.C Lieu d'Art Contemporain, located in Hameau du lac, hosts arts exhibition and performances in a former winery.
- The Zoo Réserve Africaine de Sigean

== See also ==
- Corbières AOC
- Communes of the Aude department
