= European Association of Zoos and Aquaria =

Organisation for the European zoo and aquarium community

- Abbreviation: EAZA
- Formation: 1992; 34 years ago
- Type: NGO
- Purpose: To facilitate cooperation within the European zoo and aquarium community towards the goals of education, research and conservation.
- Headquarters: Amsterdam, Netherlands
- Region served: Europe, Western Asia
- Methods: Accreditation
- Main organ: Council and Committees
- Parent organization: World Association of Zoos and Aquariums
- Website: www.eaza.net
- Formerly called: European Community Association of Zoos and Aquaria (ECAZA)
- "Progressive Zoos and Aquariums Saving Species Together With You"

The European Association of Zoos and Aquaria (EAZA) is an organisation for the European zoo and aquarium community that links over 340 member organisations in 41 countries. EAZA membership is open to all zoos and aquaria across Europe that comply with EAZA's standards. The organisation is administered and headquartered at Natura Artis Magistra in Amsterdam, the Netherlands.

The mission of the association is to promote cooperation for furthering regional collection planning and wildlife conservation. EAZA also promotes educational activities and advises EU lawmakers through standing committees of the European Parliament and the European Council.

== EAZA Ex-situ Programme ==
EAZA manages the EAZA Ex-situ Programme (EEP), a population management and conservation programme. As of 2022, over 400 animal species are represented in the programme.

Each EEP has a coordinator who is assisted by a species committee. The coordinator collects information on the status of all the animals kept in EAZA zoos and aquariums of the species for which they are responsible, produces a studbook, carries out demographic and genetic analyses, produces a plan for the future management of the species and provides recommendations to participating institutions.

== Thematic conservation campaigns ==
Every two years EAZA launches a campaign dedicated to a threatened species or a threatened Environment. The campaign's aims are to draw attention to the problem, to promote biodiversity awareness, raise funds for special projects and to do lobbying work in national governments and international organizations.

The campaigns address EAZA members to get involved in the themes and to spread information about the importance of biodiversity and its conservation to the visitors.

EAZA campaigns list
Years active	Campaign	Theme / species
2024–2025	Vietnamazing	Joining forces to save Vietnam‘s species
2022–2023	EAZA21+	Internal campaign for EAZA Members
2020–2021	Which fish?	Sustainable aquatic resources
2017–2019	Silent Forest	Asian songbird crisis
2015–2017	Let it Grow	Local biodiversity
2014–2015	Pole to Pole	Penguins, polar bears, the Arctic and Antarctic in general
2011–2013	Southeast Asia	
2010–2011	Apes	
2008–2010	European Carnivore	
2007–2008	Amphibian	
2006–2007	Madagascar	
2005–2006	Rhino	
2004–2005	ShellShock	Tortoises and turtles
2002–2004	Tiger	
2001–2002	Rainforest	
2000–2001	Bushmeat	Unsustainable and illegal hunt and trade of threatened wildlife

=== Campaign for the Ukrainian zoos ===
In 2022, during the Russo-Ukrainian War, EAZA launched a funding campaign to save animals from Ukrainian zoos. In June 2022 EAZA had collected €1 324 884 from over 130 institutional and 11 000 private donors, and funds have been provided to nearly 20 institutions in Ukraine. Funds were allocated on the basis of need according to the requests received from zoos, and were distributed to recipients through channels subject to change due to possible war-time disruptions.

== List of EAZA member institutions ==
As of October 2023, EAZA has 308 Full Members, 20 Temporary Members, 20 Candidates for Membership, 55 Corporate Members and 38 Associate Members represented in 47 countries.

=== Full members ===
Institution Name (and native name)	Country	City	Other association memberships
Aalborg Zoo	Denmark	Aalborg	DAZA, WAZA
Aquarium of Genoa (Acquario di Genova)	Italy	Genoa	UIZA
Ähtäri Zoo (Ähtärin eläinpuisto)	Finland	Ähtäri	
Bergen Aquarium (Akvariet i Bergen)	Norway	Bergen	
Al Ain Zoo	(United Arab Emirates) Emirate of Abu Dhabi	Al Ain	
Allwetterzoo Münster	Germany	Münster	VDZ
Alpenzoo Innsbruck-Tirol	Austria	Innsbruck	VDZ
Apenheul Primate Park	Netherlands	Apeldoorn	NVD
Aquarium Barcelona	Spain	Barcelona	
AquaZoo Leeuwarden	Netherlands	Leeuwarden	
Aquazoo - Löbbecke Museum	Germany	Düsseldorf	VDZ
Arabia's Wildlife Centre	United Arab Emirates	Sharjah	
Aspinall Foundation - Howletts Wild Animal Park	United Kingdom		BIAZA
Aspinall Foundation - Port Lympne Hotel & Reserve	United Kingdom	Lympne	BIAZA
Attica Zoological Park	Greece	Spata	
Belfast Zoological Gardens	United Kingdom	Belfast	BIAZA
Bellewaerde	Belgium		
Bioparc Fuengirola	Spain	Fuengirola	AIZA
Bioparc Valencia	Spain	Valencia	AIZA
Blackpool Zoo	United Kingdom	Blackpool	BIAZA
Borås Djurpark AB	Sweden	Borås	SAZA
Bojnická zoologická záhrada	Slovakia	Bojnice	
Budapest Zoological and Botanical Gardens (Budapest Fővárosi Állat- és Növénykert)	Hungary	Budapest	
Bursa Zoo	Turkey	Bursa	
Curraghs Wildlife Park	United Kingdom	Ballaugh	
Rotterdam Zoo (Diergaarde Blijdorp)	Netherlands		
Drayton Manor Zoo	United Kingdom		
Dudley Zoological Gardens	United Kingdom	Dudley	
Durrell Wildlife Conservation Trust - Durrell Wildlife Park	United Kingdom	Trinity	BIAZA
East Midlands Zoological Society Ltd. - Twycross Zoo	United Kingdom	Twycross	BIAZA
Erlebnis-Zoo Hannover	Germany	Hanover	VDZ
Faruk Yalcin Zoo	Turkey	Darıca	
Folly Farm Adventure Park and Zoo	United Kingdom	Begelly	BIAZA
Fondazione Bioparco di Roma	Italy	Rome	UIZA
Galway Atlantaquaria	Republic of Ireland		BIAZA
Givskud Zoo	Denmark		
Haus des Meeres - Agua Terra Zoo	Austria	Vienna	VDZ
İzmir Wildlife Park (İzmir Doğal Yaşam Parkı)	Turkey	Izmir	
Jardim Zoologico de Lisboa	Portugal	Lisbon	
Järvzoo AB	Sweden	Järvsö	
Korkeasaari Zoo (Korkeasaaren eläintarha)	Finland	Helsinki	WAZA, SAZA
KMDA ZOO Antwerpen	Belgium	Antwerp	
KMDA ZOO Planckendael	Belgium		
Emerald Park	Republic of Ireland	Ashbourne	
Kolmården Wildlife Park (Kolmårdens djurpark)	Sweden	Norrköping	SAZA
Knowsley Safari Park	United Kingdom		BIAZA
Longleat Safari and Adventure Park	United Kingdom		BIAZA
Loro Parque S.A.	Spain	Puerto de la Cruz	AIZA
Marwell Wildlife	United Kingdom	Winchester	BIAZA
Wroclaw Zoo (Miejski Ogród Zoologiczny we Wrocławiu)	Poland	Wroclaw	WAZA
Miejski Ogród Zoologiczny w Łodzi Sp. z.o.o.	Poland	Lodz	
Warsaw Zoo (Miejski Ogród Zoologiczny w Warszawie)	Poland	Warsaw	WAZA
Monkey World Ape Rescue Centre	United Kingdom	Wool	BIAZA
Moscow State Zoological Park (Московский зоопарк)	Russia	Moscow	EARAZA, WAZA
Muséum national d'histoire naturelle - Ménagerie du Jardin des plantes	France	Paris	
Muséum national d'histoire naturelle - Parc Zoologique De Clères	France	Clères	
Muséum national d'histoire naturelle - Parc Zoologique de Paris	France	Paris	
Muséum national d'histoire naturelle - Réserve Zoologique de la Haute-Touche	France	Obterre	
Münchener Tierpark Hellabrunn AG	Germany		VDZ
Natura Artis Magistra - Artis Amsterdam Royal Zoo	Netherlands	Amsterdam	NVD
Nordens Ark	Sweden		SAZA
North of England Zoological Society - Chester Zoo	United Kingdom	Chester	BIAZA
Oceanario de Lisboa	Portugal	Lisbon	
Odense Zoo	Denmark	Odense	
Ogród Zoobotaniczny w Toruniu	Poland	Torun	
Ogród Zoologiczny w Opolu	Poland	Opole	
Ogród Zoologiczny w Zamościu	Poland	Zamosc	
Opel-Zoo	Germany	Kronberg im Taunus	VDZ
Ouwehands Dierenpark Rhenen	Netherlands	Rhenen	NVD
Pairi Daiza	Belgium	Cambron-Casteau	
Parc le PAL	France		
Parc Zoologique de Thoiry	France		
Parco Faunistico Le Cornelle	Italy		UIZA
Parco Natura Viva, Parco Zoo e Autosafari	Italy		UIZA
Parken Zoo	Sweden	Eskilstuna	SAZA
Parque Zoológico de Barcelona	Spain	Barcelona	AIZA, WAZA
Parque Zoológico y Jardín Botánico Alberto Durán - Zoobotánico Jerez	Spain	Jerez de la Frontera	AIZA
Ranua Wildlife Park (Ranua Resort)	Finland	Ranua	
Ree Park - Ebeltoft Safari	Denmark	Ebeltoft	DAZA
Réserve Africaine de Sigean	France		
Riga Zoo	Latvia	Riga	
Royal Burgers' Zoo	Netherlands	Arnhem	NVD
Royal Zoological Society of Scotland - Edinburgh Zoo	United Kingdom	Edinburgh	BIAZA
Royal Zoological Society of Scotland - Highland Wildlife Park	United Kingdom	Kingussie	BIAZA
Saarbrücker Zoo	Germany	Saarbrücken	VDZ
Safari Park Dvůr Králové	Czech Republic	Dvur Kralove nad Labem	UCSZOO
Safaripark Beekse Bergen	Netherlands	Hilvarenbeek	NVD
Salzburg Zoo (Tiergarten Hellbrunn)	Austria	Salzburg	VDZ
Serengeti-Park Hodenhagen GmbH	Germany	Hodenhagen	VDZ
Skansen-Akvariet	Sweden	Stockholm	SAZA
Sofia Zoo (Софийски зоопарк)	Bulgaria	Sofia	
Tallinn Zoo (Tallinn Loomaaed)	Estonia	Tallinn	EARAZA, VDZ, WAZA
The Tisch Family Zoological Gardens	Israel	Jerusalem	IZA, WAZA
Tiergarten der Stadt Nürnberg	Germany	Nurnberg	VDZ
Tiergarten Schönbrunn	Austria	Vienna	VDZ
Tierpark Berlin-Friedrichsfelde	Germany	Berlin	VDZ
Tierpark Chemnitz	Germany	Chemnitz	VDZ
Tierpark Dählhölzli	Switzerland	Bern	VDZ
Tierpark Hagenbeck GmbH	Germany	Hamburg	VDZ
Tierpark Nordhorn	Germany	Nordhorn	VDZ
Tierpark und Fossilium Bochum	Germany	Bochum	VDZ
Vogelpark Avifauna	Netherlands	Alphen aan den Rijn	
Welsh Mountain Zoo and Botanic Gardens	United Kingdom		BIAZA
Weltvogelpark Walsrode	Germany	Walsrode	VDZ
West Midlands Safari & Leisure Park	United Kingdom		
Wilhelma, der Zoologisch-Botanische Garten	Germany	Stuttgart	VDZ, WAZA
Wild Planet Trust - Newquay Zoo	United Kingdom	Newquay	BIAZA
Wild Planet Trust - Paignton Zoo	United Kingdom	Paignton	BIAZA
Wildlands Adventure Zoo Emmen	Netherlands	Emmen	NVD
Woburn Safari Park	United Kingdom		BIAZA
Woodside Wildlife Park	United Kingdom		
Yorkshire Wildlife Park	United Kingdom	Branton	BIAZA
Zoo am Meer	Germany	Bremerhaven	VDZ
Zoo Aquarium de Madrid	Spain	Madrid	AIZA
Zoo Brno	Czech Republic	Brno	UCSZOO
Zoo de Doué	France	Doue-la-Fontaine	
Zoo de La Flèche	France	La Fleche	
Zoo de La Palmyre	France	Les Mathes	ANPZ, WAPCA, CEPA, AEECL
Zoo Dortmund	Germany	Dortmund	VDZ
Zoo Dresden	Germany	Dresden	VDZ, WAZA
Zoo Hoyerswerda	Germany	Hoyerswerda	VDZ
Zoo Krefeld	Germany	Krefeld	VDZ
Zoo Landau in der Pfalz	Germany	Landau in der Pfalz	VDZ
Zoological Center Tel Aviv-Ramat Gan - Ramat Gan Safari	Israel	Ramat Gan	IZA, WAZA
Zoological Society of East Anglia - Africa Alive Reserve	United Kingdom	Suffolk	BIAZA
Zoological Society of East Anglia - Banham Zoological Gardens	United Kingdom	Banham	BIAZA, WAZA
Zoological Society of Ireland Ltd. - Dublin Zoo	Republic of Ireland	Dublin	BIAZA, WAZA
Zoological Society of Ireland Ltd. - Fota Wildlife Park	Republic of Ireland	Carrigtwohill	
Zoological Society of London - London Zoo	United Kingdom	London	BIAZA, WAZA
Zoological Society of London - Whipsnade Zoo	United Kingdom	Dunstable	BIAZA, WAZA
Zoologická a botanická zahrada města Plzně	Czech Republic	Plzen	UCSZOO
Zoologická zahrada hl. m. Prahy	Czech Republic	Prague	UCSZOO, WAZA
Zoo Basel (Zoologischer Garten Basel)	Switzerland	Basel	VDZ, WAZA
Berlin Zoo	Germany	Berlin	VDZ, WAZA
Zoologischer Garten Frankfurt am Main	Germany	Frankfurt	VDZ
Zoologischer Garten Halle (Saale) - Bergzoo Halle	Germany	Halle (Saale)	VDZ
Heidelberg Zoo (Zoo Heidelberg)	Germany	Heidelberg	VDZ, WAZA
Karlsruhe Zoo (Zoologischer Garten Karlsruhe)	Germany	Karlsruhe	VDZ
Cologne Zoological Garden (Zoologischer Garten Köln - Kölner Zoo)	Germany	Cologne	VDZ, WAZA
Leipzig Zoological Garden (Zoologischer Garten Leipzig)	Germany	Leipzig	VDZ, WAZA
Madeburg Zoo (Zoologischer Garten Magdeburg GmbH)	Germany	Magdeburg	VDZ
Rostock Zoo (Zoologischer Garten Rostock GmbH)	Germany	Rostock	VDZ
Wuppertal Zoo (Zoologischer Garten Wuppertal)	Germany	Wuppertal	VDZ, WAZA
Copenhagen Zoo (Zoologisk Have København)	Denmark	Copenhagen	DAZA, VDZ, WAZA
ZOOM Erlebniswelt Gelsenkirchen	Germany	Gelsenkirchen	VDZ
Osnabrück Zoo (Zoo Osnabrück gGmbH)	Germany	Osnabruck	VDZ, WAZA
Ostrava Zoo	Czech Republic	Ostrava	UCSZOO
ZooParc de Beauval	France	Saint-Aignan	ANPZ, CEPA, WAZA
Zoo Brașov	Romania	Brașov	
Zoo Parc Overloon	Netherlands	Overloon	NVD
Zoo Schwerin	Germany	Schwerin	VDZ
Zoo Zürich	Switzerland	Zürich	VDZ, WAZA
Zagreb Zoo	Croatia	Zagreb	WAZA

=== Temporary members ===
Institution Name (and native name)	Country	City	Other association memberships
EcoZonia	France		
Dubai Safari Park	United Arab Emirates	Dubai	
The Green Planet	United Arab Emirates	Dubai	
Kaliningrad Zoo	Russia	Kaliningrad	EARAZA
Les Terres de Nataé	France	Pont-Scorff	
Poznań Zoo	Poland	Poznań	
Río Safari Elche	Spain		
Tierpark Ueckermünde	Germany	Ueckermünde	
Zoo delle Maitine	Italy		
BARK Biopark Barquinha	Portugal		
Fife Zoo	United Kingdom	Fife	
Natura Park – Zoo de Carratraca	Spain		
Tbilisi Zoo	(Georgia (country)) Georgia	Tbilisi	
Zoo d'Aïn Sebaâ	Morocco	Casablanca	

=== Candidates for membership ===
Institution Name (and native name)	Country	City	Other association memberships
Mykolaiv Zoo (Миколаївський зоопарк)	Ukraine	Mykolaiv	EARAZA, UAZA
Kharkiv Zoo (Харківський зоопарк)	Ukraine	Kharkiv	EARAZA, UAZA
Kyiv Zoo (Київський зоопарк)	Ukraine	Kyiv	EARAZA, UAZA
Almaty Zoological Park	Kazakhstan	Almaty	EARAZA
Belgrade Zoo	Serbia	Belgrade	
Eram Zoo	Iran	Tehran	
Gan-Garoo Australian Park	Israel	Nir David	
KJKP Park doo Sarajevo – Zoo Sarajevo	Bosnia and Herzegovina	Sarajevo	
Krasnoyarsk Park of Flora and Fauna "Roev Ruchey"	Russia	Krasnoyarsk	EARAZA
Leningrad Zoo	Russia	Saint Petersburg	EARAZA
Kaunas Zoo (Lietuvos Zoologijos Sodas Kaunas Zoo)	Lithuania	Kaunas	
Midbarium	Israel	Beersheba	
Parc Animalier de Bouillon	Belgium	Bouillon	
Qalqilia Zoo	Palestine	Qalqilya	
Novosibirsk Zoo (Rostislav Shilo)	Russia	Novosibirsk	EARAZA
Skopje Zoo	North Macedonia	Skopje	
Târgu Mureș Zoo	Romania	Târgu Mureș	
Tbilisi Zoo	(Georgia (country)) Georgia	Tbilisi	
Yerevan Zoo	Armenia	Yerevan	
Zoo Osijek	Croatia	Osijek	
Zoo Palić	Serbia	Palić	
Zoo Sibiu	Romania	Sibiu	

=== Associate members ===
Organisations with their own regional memberships
Institution Name	Abbreviation	Country
Latin American Zoo & Aquarium Association (Asociación Latinoamericana de Parques Zoológicos y Acuarios)	ALPZA	Chile
Associação Portuguesa de Zoos e Aquários	APZA	Portugal
Association Française des Parcs Zoologiques	AFDPZ	France
Association of Directors of Polish Zoological Gardens and Aquariums	RDPOZA	Poland
Association of Hungarian Zoos (Magyar Allatkertek Szovetsege)	MASZ	Hungary
British and Irish Association of Zoos and Aquariums	BIAZA	United Kingdom
Danish Association of Zoos and Aquaria	DAZA	Denmark
Dutch Zoo Federation (Nederlandse Vereniging van Dierentuinen	VND	Netherlands
Iberian Association of Zoos & Aquaria (Asociación Ibérica de Zoos y Acuarios)	AIZA	Spain
Romanian Zoo and Aquaria Federation	SZAF / FBZAR	Romania
Swedish Association of Zoos and Aquaria (Svenska Djurparksföreningen)	SAZA / SDF	Sweden
Union of Czech and Slovak Zoological Gardens (Unie českých a slovenských zoologických zahrad)	USCZOO	Czech Republic
Italian Association of Zoos and Aquaria (L'Unione Italiana degli Zoo e Acquari)	UIZA	Italy
Verband der Zoologischen Gärten	VDZ	Germany

Other associate members
Institution Name	Category	Country
Bears in Mind	Conservation	Netherlands
Derbianus Conservation	Conservation	Czech Republic
Foundation for the Preservation of Wildlife and Cultural Assets	Conservation	Armenia
Leibniz Institute for Zoo and Wildlife Research	Conservation	Germany
Snow Leopard Trust	Conservation	United States
Species360	Conservation	United States
Stiftung Artenschutz	Conservation	Germany
The Big Cat Sanctuary	Conservation	United Kingdom
The World Pheasant Association	Conservation	United Kingdom
Zoological Society for the Conservation of Species and Populations (ZGAP)	Conservation	Germany
Goethe University Frankfurt - Zoo Biology	Education	Germany
Hansenberg School	Education	Denmark
Nottingham Trent University	Education	United Kingdom
Van Hall Larensteinn	Education	Netherlands
European Association of Zoo and Wildlife Veterinarians	Zoo staff	Belgium
Verband Deutschsprachiger Zoopadagogen e.V.	Zoo staff	Germany
Auckland Zoo	Zoo / Aquarium	New Zealand
Jurong Bird Park	Zoo / Aquarium	Singapore
Mandai Wildlife Reserve	Zoo / Aquarium	Singapore
Taipei Zoo	Zoo / Aquarium	Taiwan

=== Indirect members ===
These zoos and aquariums are members through an aforementioned associate organization.

== See also ==
- List of zoo associations
- World Association of Zoos and Aquariums
