= List of zoos and aquariums in Ireland =

The list of zoos and aquariums in Ireland includes zoos and aquaria in Ireland, including those who are members of the British and Irish Association of Zoos and Aquariums.

== List ==
=== Zoos ===
==== Major facilities ====
- Dublin Zoo (Dublin)
- Fota Wildlife Park (Cork)

==== Specialist facilities ====
- Ardmore Open Farm and Mini Zoo (Waterford)
- Clonfert Pet Farm (Kildare)
- Emerald Park (Ashbourne, County Meath)
- Moher Hill Open Farm and Leisure Park
- National Reptile Zoo (Kilkenny)
- Secret Valley Wildlife Park (Wexford)
- Tropical World (Letterkenny)
- Wild Ireland (County Donegal)
- Wild Encounters Mini Zoo (Coolyroe, County Limerick)

=== Aquaria ===
- Dingle Oceanworld (Dingle)
- Galway Atlantaquaria (Galway)
- The Achill Experience Aquarium and Visitor Centre (Achill)
- Marine Life Bray (Bray, County Wicklow)
