= Odense Zoo =

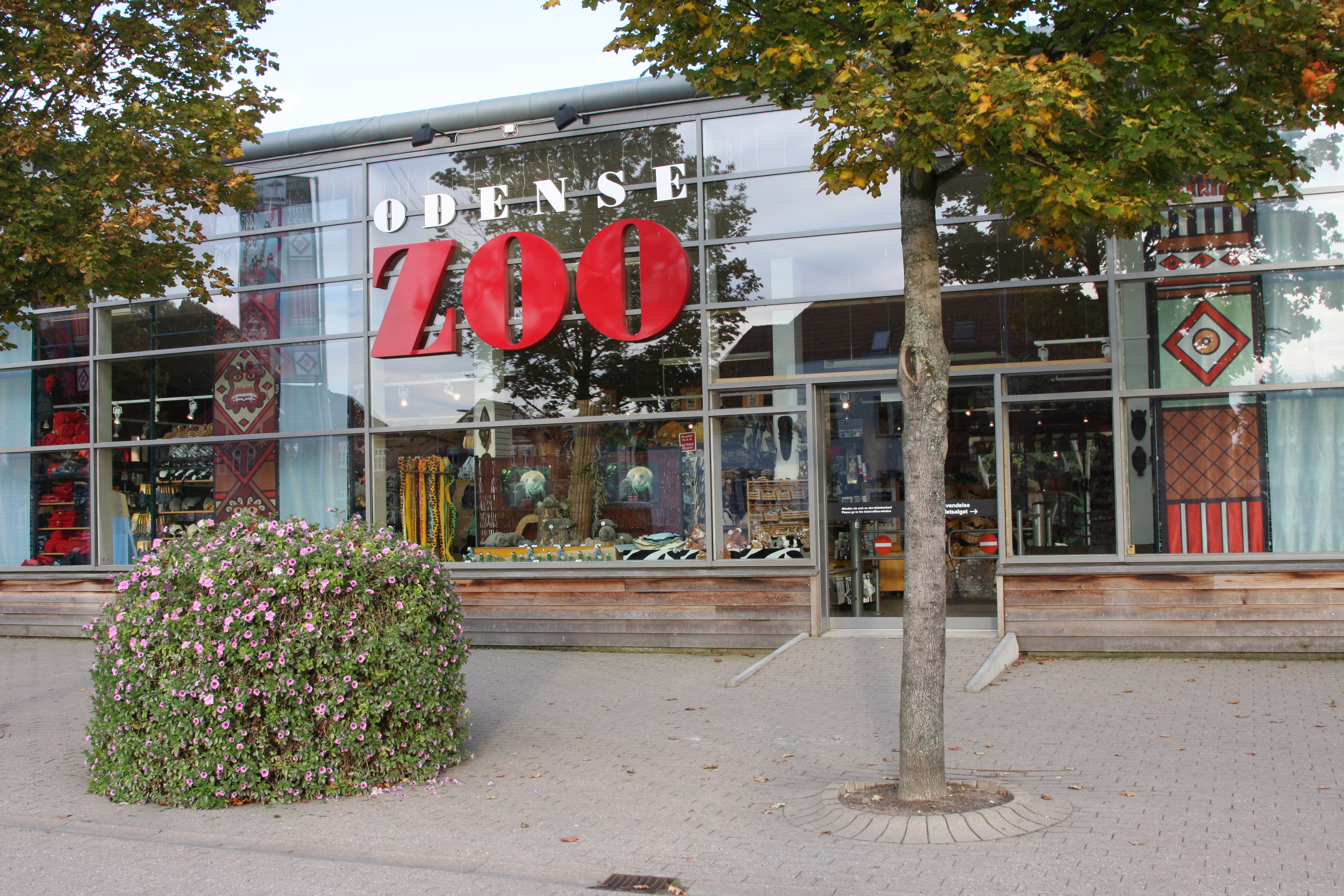
- Main entrance
- Interactive map of Odense Zoo
- 55.378°N 10.373°E
- Date opened: 1930
- Location: Odense, Denmark
- Land area: 3.6 hectares (8.9 acres)
- No. of species: 100
- Memberships: EAZA, WAZA
- Website: www.odensezoo.dk

Odense Zoo is a zoological garden in Odense, Denmark.

At the time of its opening in 1930, the zoo had two apes, a peacock, a deer, a mule, magpies, and guinea pigs. Today, the zoo has animals from all over the world, covering around 1000 species such as chimpanzee, monkeys, ring-tailed lemur, Siberian tiger, Grévy's zebra, blue wildebeests, oryxes, warthogs, gazelle, giraffe, red panda, West Indian manatee, ostrich, penguins, pink-backed pelican, greater flamingo, macaws and Aldabra giant tortoise. In 2001, Odense Zoo inaugurated a DKK 60 million "Oceanium" featuring South American animal life, ranging from the Amazon rainforest to Antarctica.

In 2008, Odense Zoo was Funen's most popular tourist attraction and number 9 in Denmark, and in 2013 it received the "Best in Europe" award in its category (zoos with up to 500,000 visitors per year). The visitor record was set in the first year of the "Oceanium" when the zoo received 439,533 visitors.

== Number of visitors ==
- 2008: 430,363
- 2007: 420,254
- 2006: 378,373
- 2005: 433,795
- 2004: 410,525
- 2003: 417,370
- 2002: 390,000 (approx.)
- 2001: 439,533 (record)
- 2000: 310,000
- 1999: 335,000
