= Zamość Zoo =

Zamość Zoo Ogród Zoologiczny w Zamościu
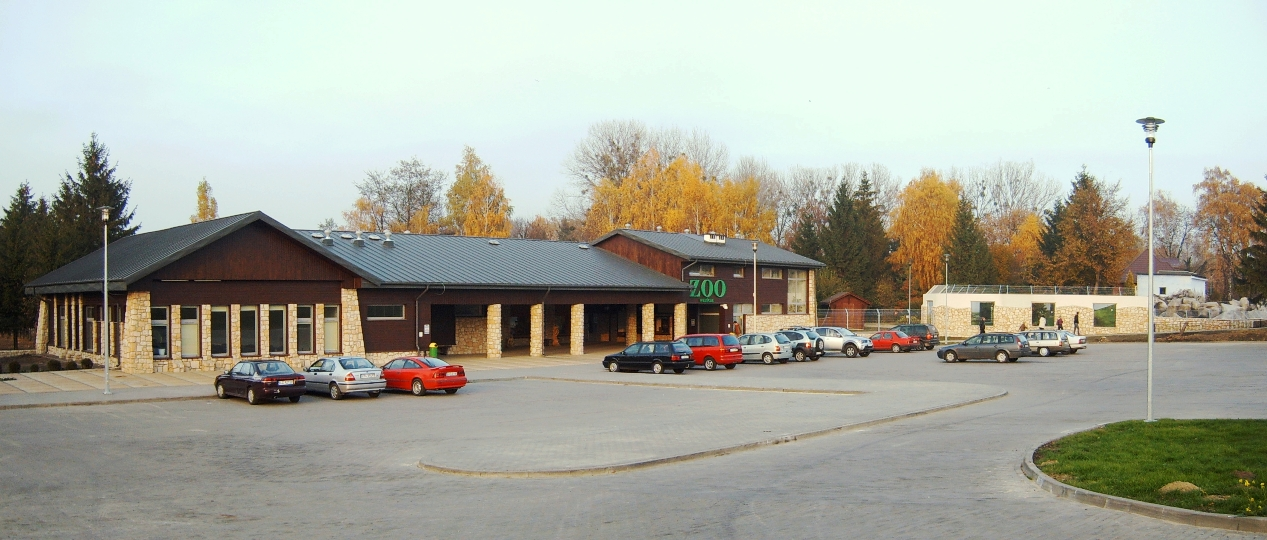
- The main entrance
- Interactive map of Zamość Zoo; Ogród Zoologiczny w Zamościu
- 50°43′0.1″N 23°14′21″E
- Date opened: 1918
- Location: Zamość, Poland
- Land area: 13 hectares (32 acres)
- No. of animals: 2524
- No. of species: 312
- Memberships: EAZA
- Director: Grzegorz Garbuz
- Website: www.zoo.zamosc.pl

The Zamość Zoo (Polish: Ogród Zoologiczny w Zamościu) is a zoological garden located in the city of Zamość, Lublin Voivodeship in Poland. It was established in 1918 and currently contains 2524 animals and 312 species covering the area of approximately 13 hectares. The zoo is a member of the European Association of Zoos and Aquaria.

== History ==
The Zamość Zoo was established in 1918 at the initiative of Stefan Miler, a teacher of the Jan Zamoyski Boys' High School. It is considered one of the oldest zoological gardens in Poland.

Currently, visitors to the Zamość Zoo can see such animals as llamas, lions, bears, giraffes, tigers, hippopotamuses, camels, donkeys, capybaras, lynxes, zebras, tapirs, porcupines, bat-eared foxes, gibbons, squirrel monkeys, macaques, pygmy marmosets, armadillos, crocodiles, iguanas, snakes, pythons, knob-billed ducks, storks, crested partridges, galahs, emus, Victoria crowned pigeons, Northern bald ibises, tawny owls, peacocks and many more.

== List of directors ==
- Stefan Miler (1919-1957)
- Tomasz Grabowski (1957-1963)
- Andrzej Jarkowski (1963-1968)
- Jerzy Tomaszewski (1968-1972)
- Czesława Leszczyńska (1972-1999)
- Jadwiga Stoczkowska (1999-2006)
- Grzegorz Garbuz (2006–present)

== Gallery ==
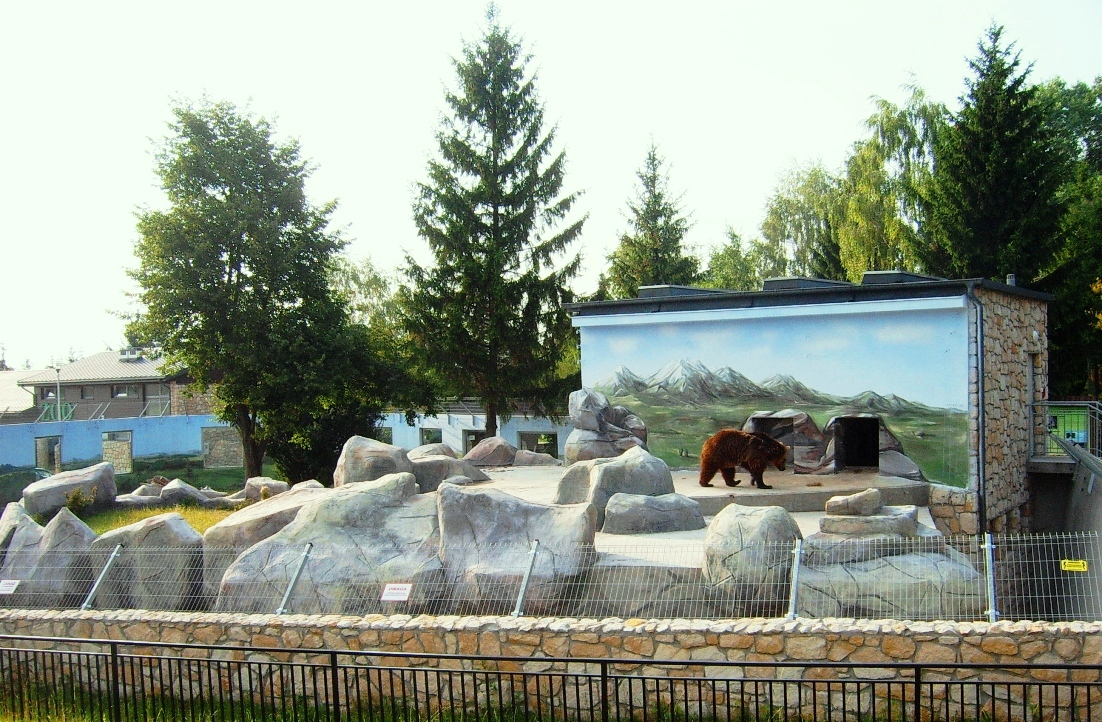
Brown bears enclosure

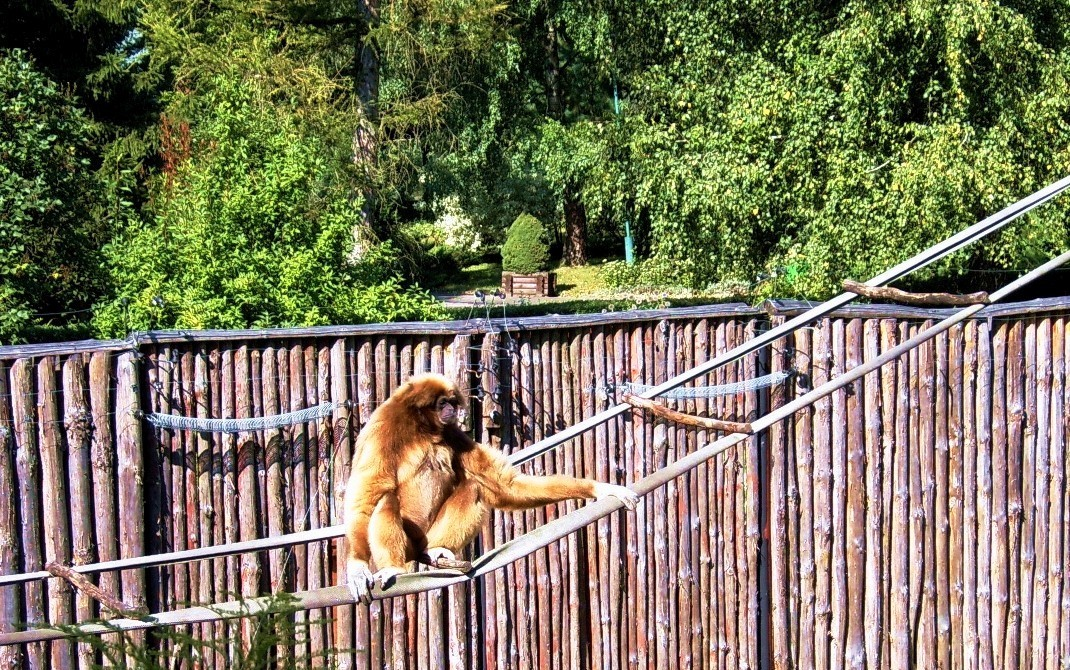
Lar gibbon

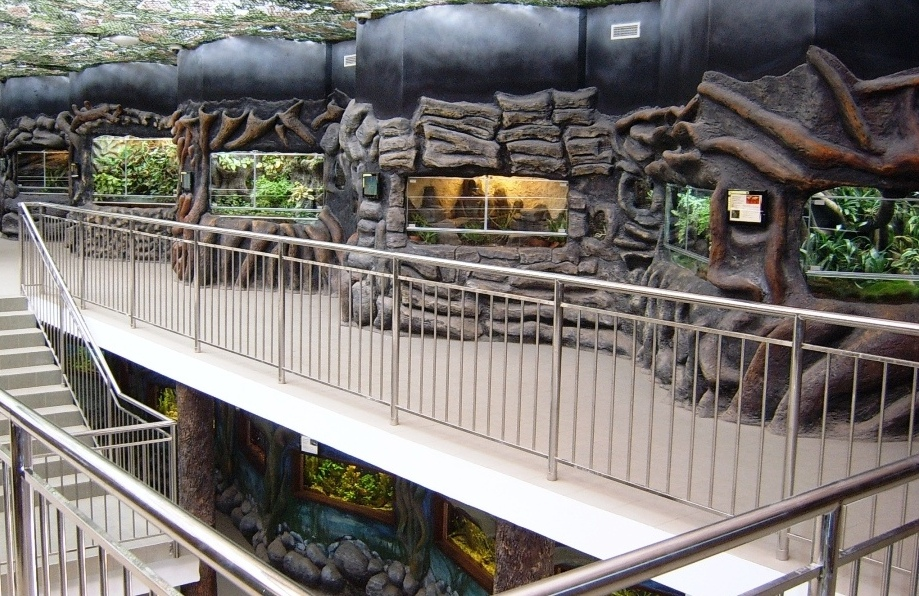
Predator animals' Pavilion

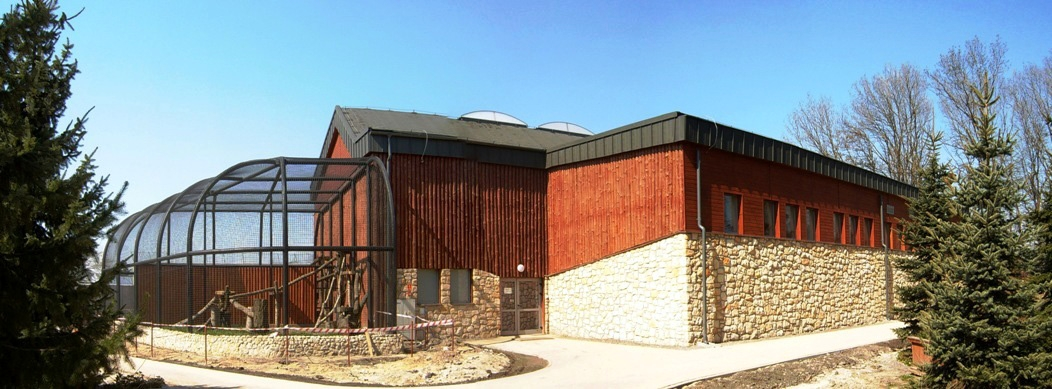
Cougars enclosure

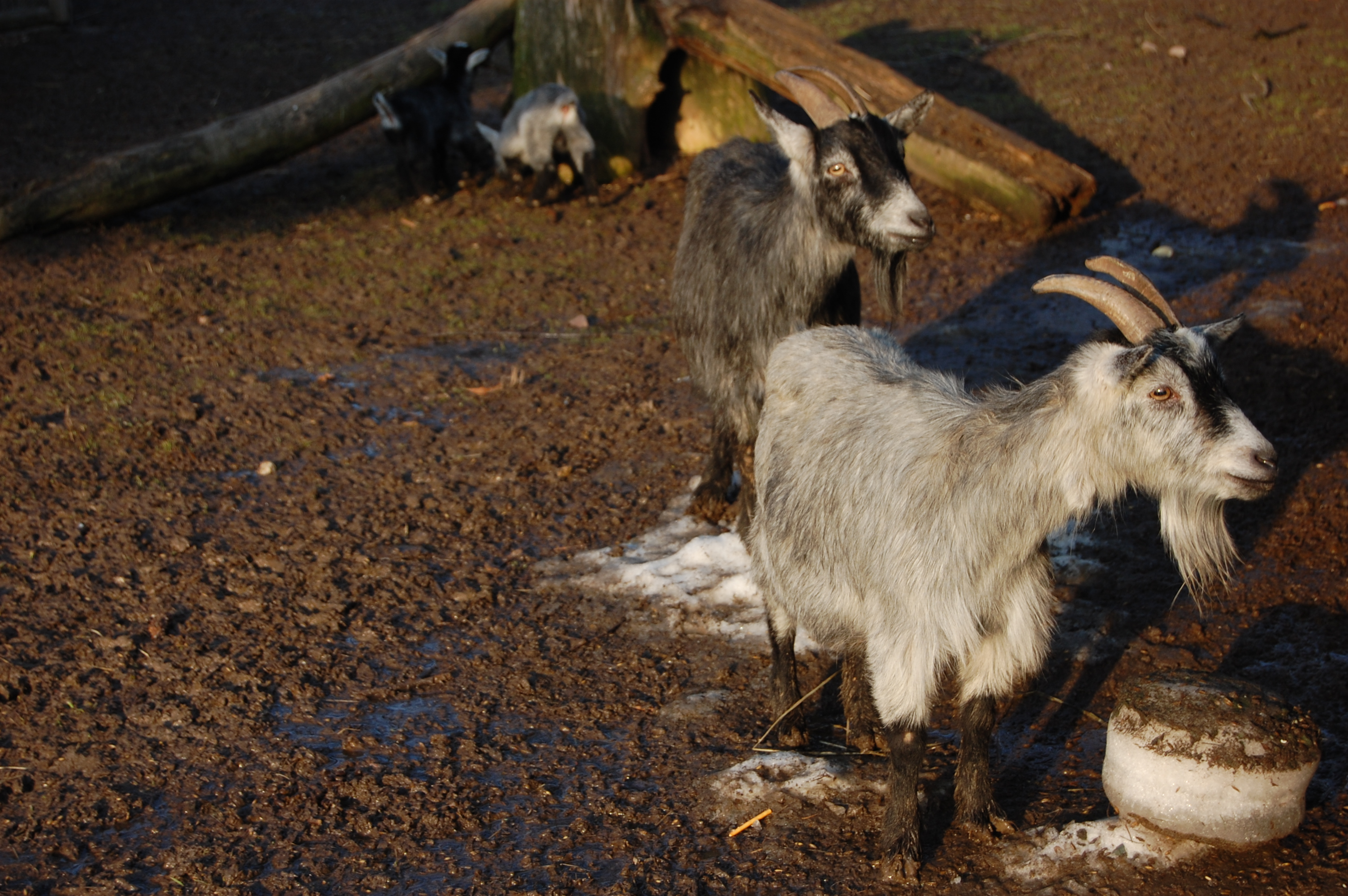
Goats

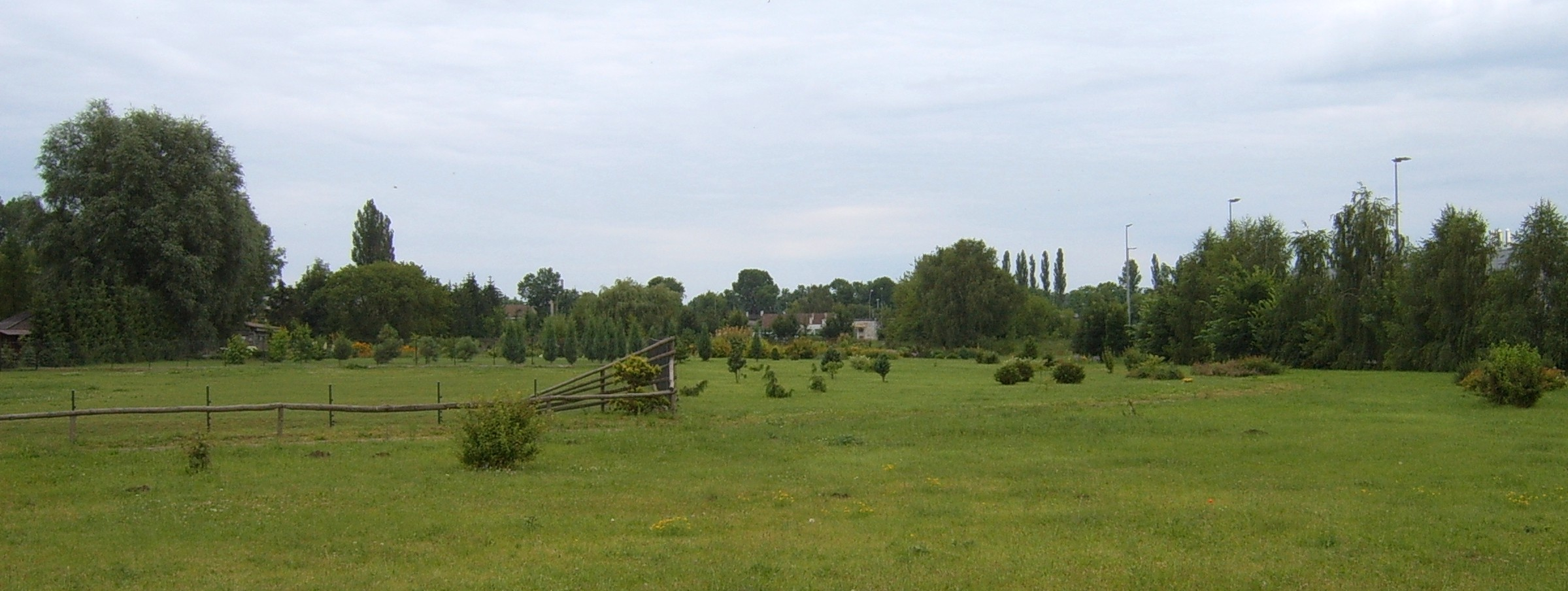
Botanical garden

== See also ==
- Warsaw Zoo
- Wrocław Zoo
- Poznań Zoo
- Kraków Zoo
