= Toruń Zoobotanical Garden =

Toruń Zoobotanical Garden Ogród Zoobotaniczny w Toruniu
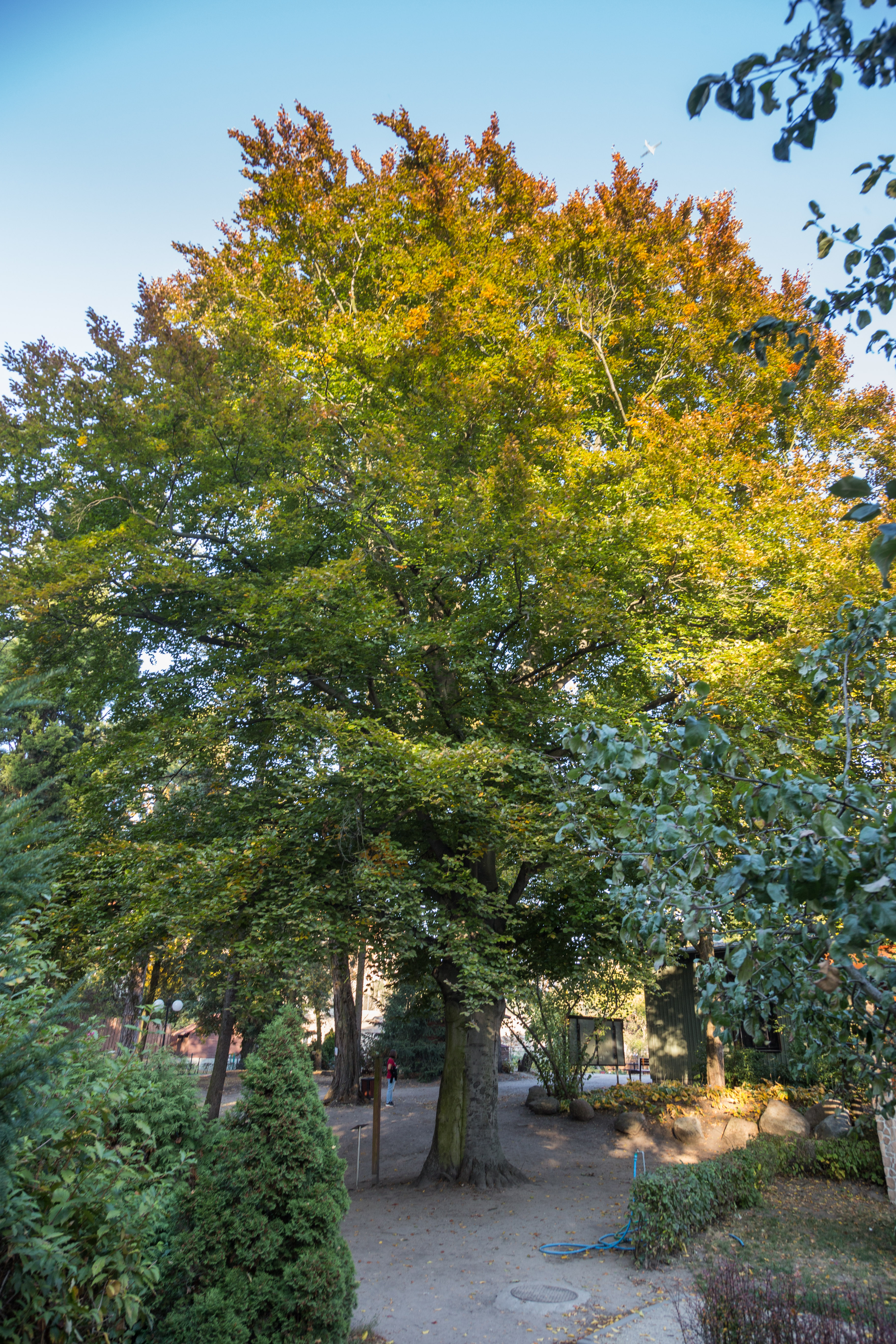
- Interactive map of Toruń Zoobotanical Garden; Ogród Zoobotaniczny w Toruniu
- 53°00′32.1″N 18°35′25.7″E
- Date opened: 1797 (botanical garden)/1965 (zoological garden)
- Location: Toruń, Poland
- Land area: 3.81 hectares (9.4 acres)
- No. of animals: 278
- No. of species: 72 (animals)/79 (plants)
- Memberships: EAZA
- Director: Beata Gęsińska
- Website: www.zoo.torun.pl/pl/ssaki

The Toruń Zoobotanical Garden (Polish: Ogród Zoobotaniczny w Toruniu) is a zoological and botanical garden located in Toruń, Kuyavian-Pomeranian Voivodeship, Poland. The botanical garden was established in 1797, which makes it one of the oldest such gardens in Poland. In 1965, the botanical garden was merged with a newly opened zoo. Since 2007, it has been a member of the European Association of Zoos and Aquaria (EAZA).

== History ==
In the second half of the 17th century, a historical manor house with a complex of outbuildings and a garden had existed on the area of the current Zoo and Botanical Garden in Toruń. In 1797, Johann Gottlieb Schultz purchased the whole area and started planting various trees and shrubs in order to establish a botanical garden. The garden was supposed to be sentimental in character, therefore, many bridges, locks, pergolas, aviaries, and greenhouses were constructed. He acquired and planted a number of rare species of European plants, which became the foundation of the botanical garden. After his death, the garden became the property of the Protestant Royal Academic Gymnasium in Toruń (Królewskie Gimnazjum w Toruniu). When the World War I came to an end, the garden experienced a period of decline and became partly overgrown with weeds. In the 1920s, during a time of rapid development in the Second Polish Republic, the botanical garden was gradually revitalized. In 1963 and 1964, thanks to Arnbert Sadecki, who resided in Argentina, a number of animals were transferred to Toruń, which led to the creation of the zoological garden. Among the first animals in the zoo were llamas, parrots, and domestic yaks. New aviaries and pavilions were built. Since the 1970s, the zoological garden has been open to visitors. In the 1990s, the zoo acquired new animals species such as monkeys, raccoon dogs, and Barbary sheep. Since 1993, the zoo has been receiving funding from the Toruń city authorities. A Mini Zoo, which offers children the possibility of playing with the animals, was also opened in this period.

In the zoo visitors can also see such animals as brown bears, European bisons, meerkats, mouflons, lynxes, porcupines, ostriches, Reeves's muntjacs, red-necked wallabies, long-tailed gorals, alpacas, and wild goats. Among the notable legally protected plants in the garden's collection are: London plane, Austrian pine, Ginkgo biloba, Turkish hazel, beech and European oak.

== List of directors ==
- Mieczysław Kwiatkowski (1920-1933)
- Franciszek Podwojski (1953-1984)
- Jadwiga Malczyńska (1984-1990)
- Urszula WIerzbowska (1990-1991)
- Piotr Demicki (1991-1993)
- Hanna Ciemiecka (1993-2012)
- Beata Gęsińska (2012–present)

== Gallery ==
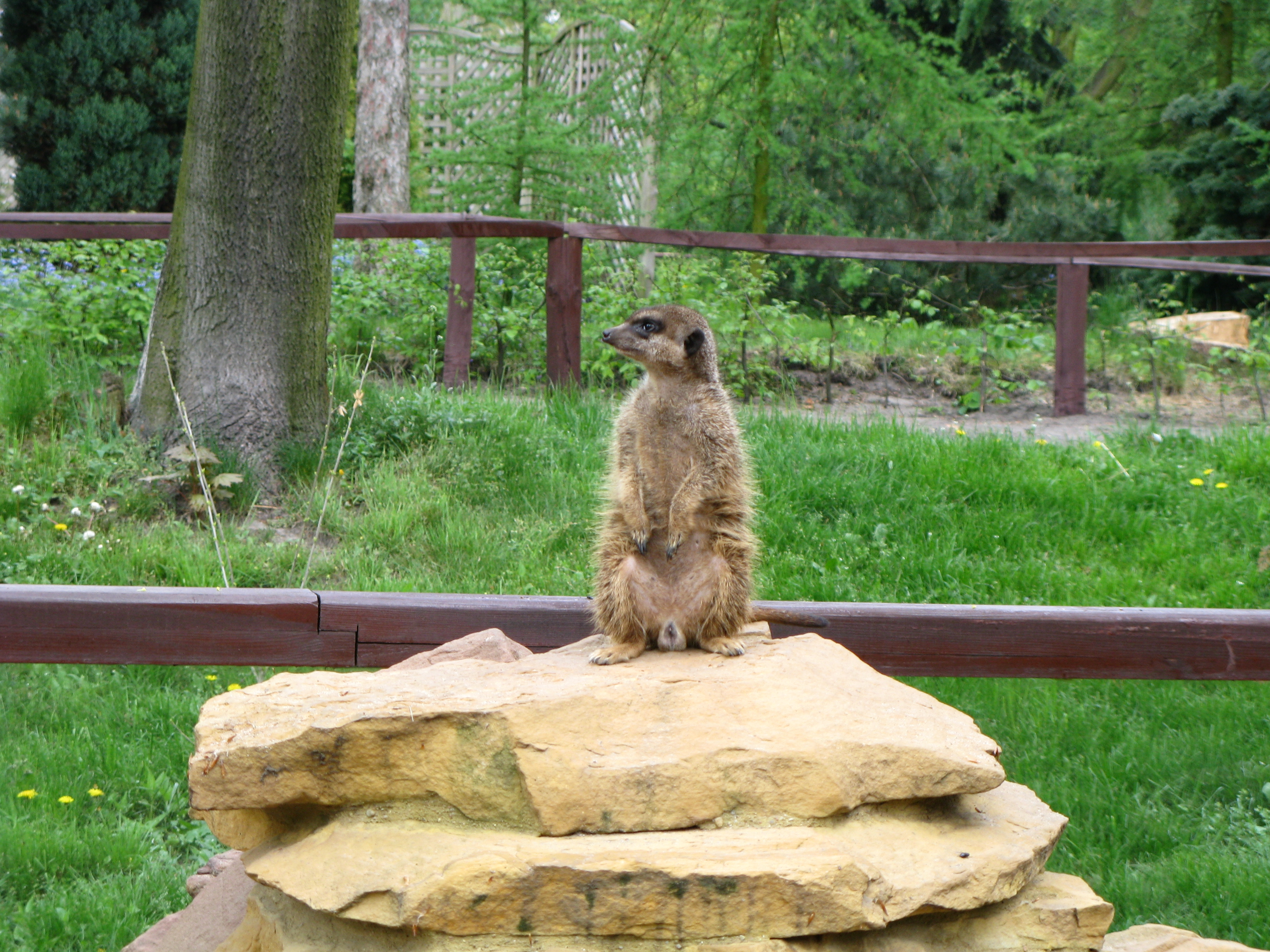
Meerkat

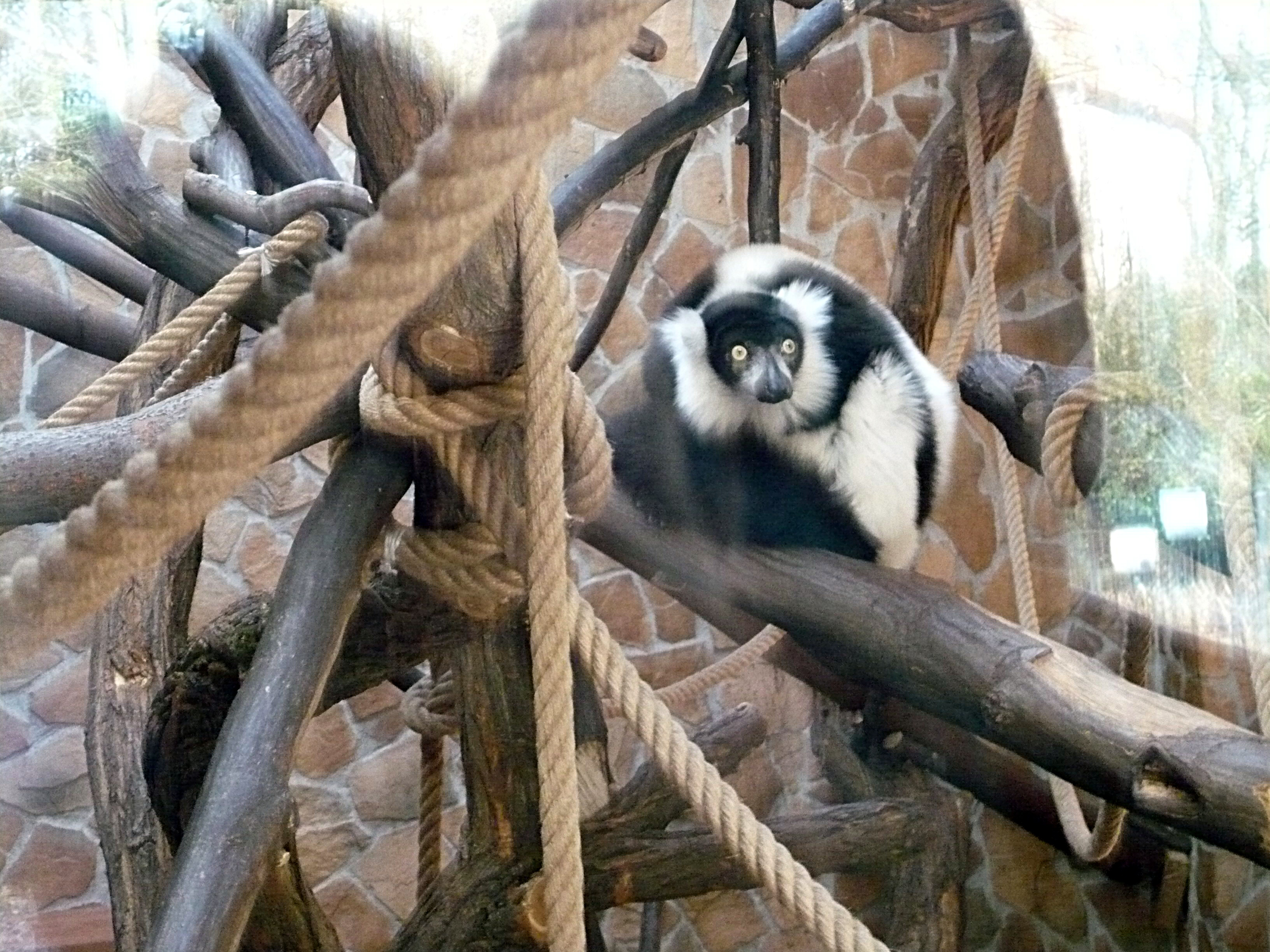
Black-and-white ruffed lemur

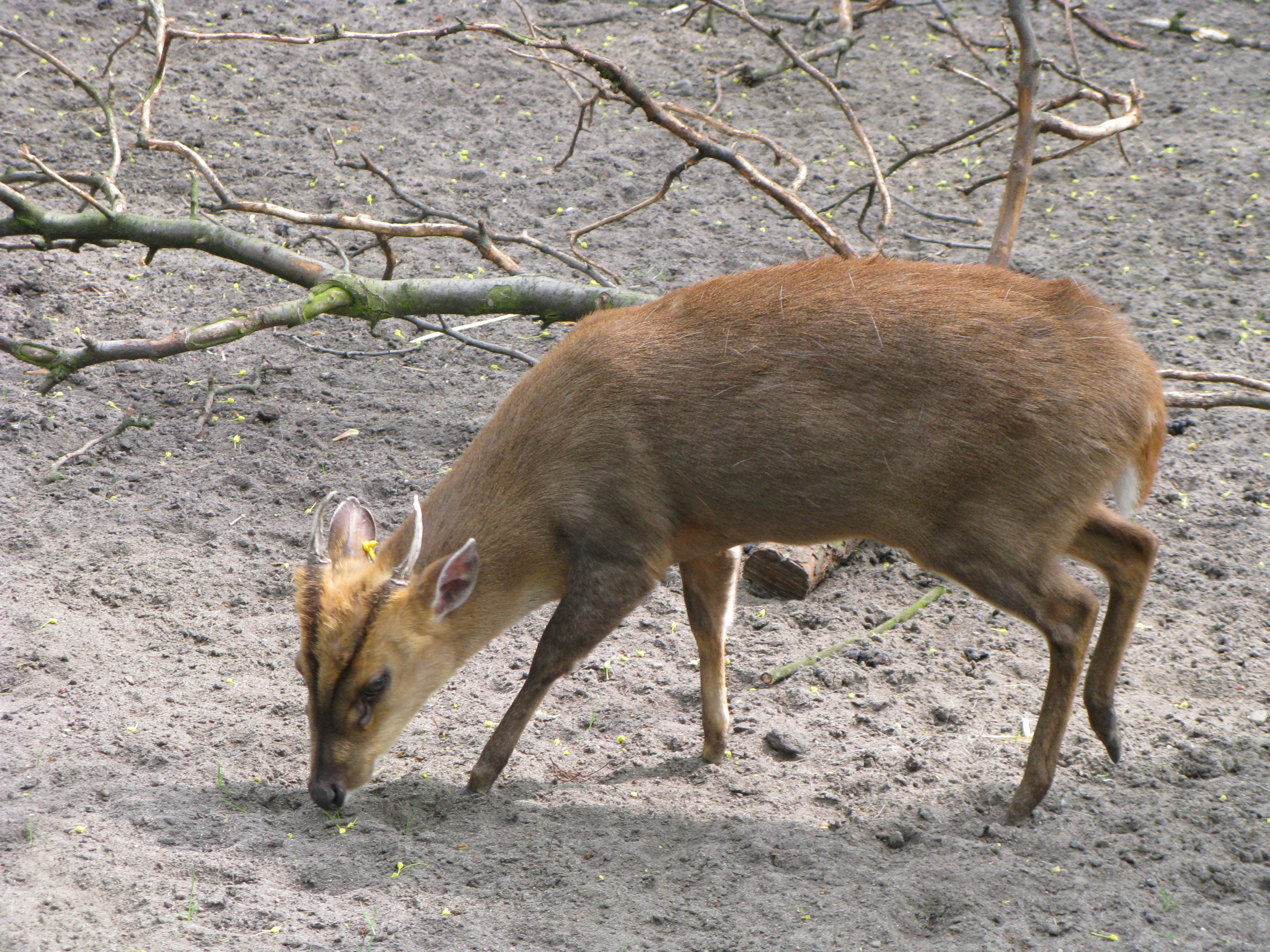
Reeves's muntjac

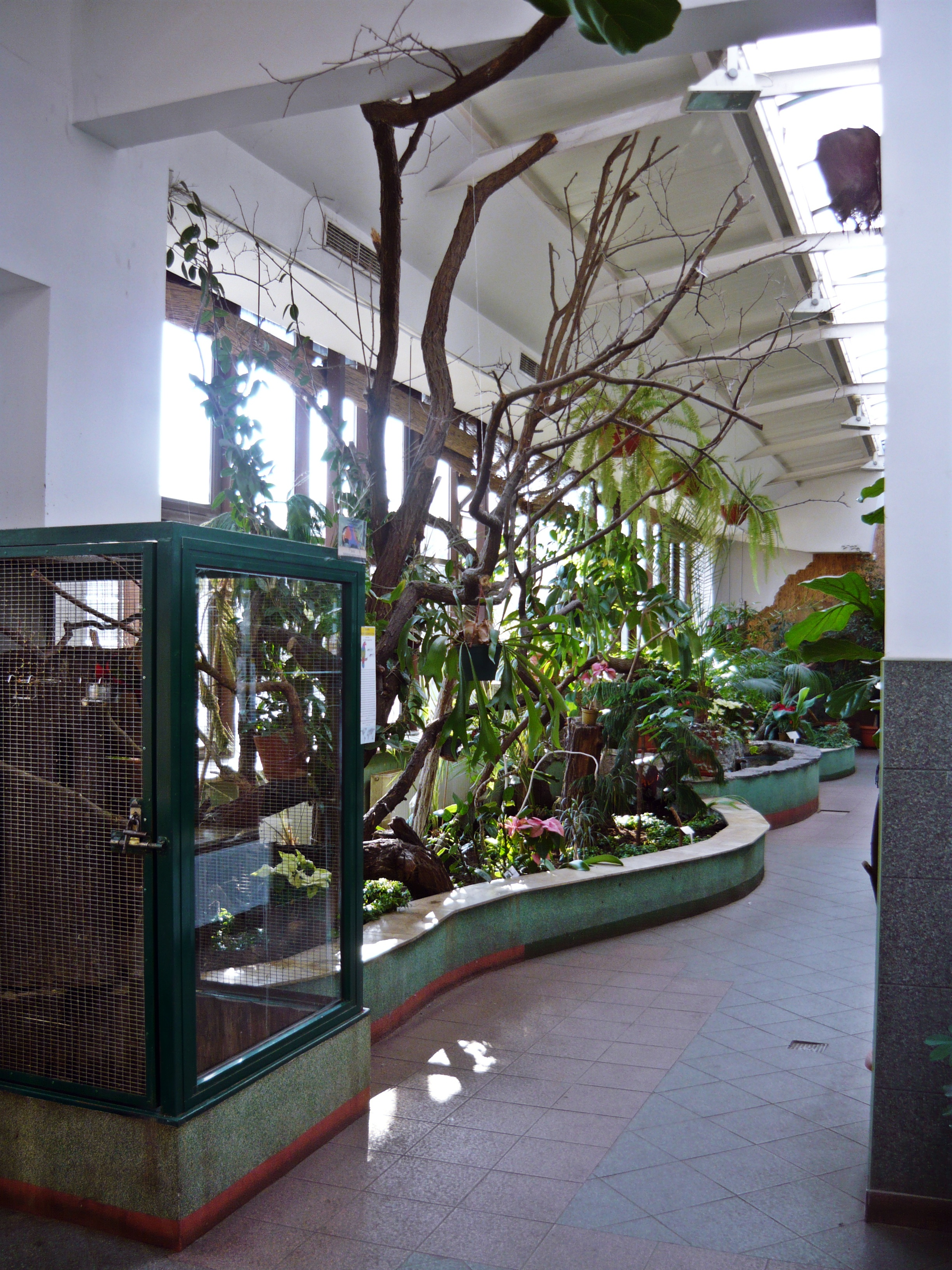
An aviary at the Toruń Zoo

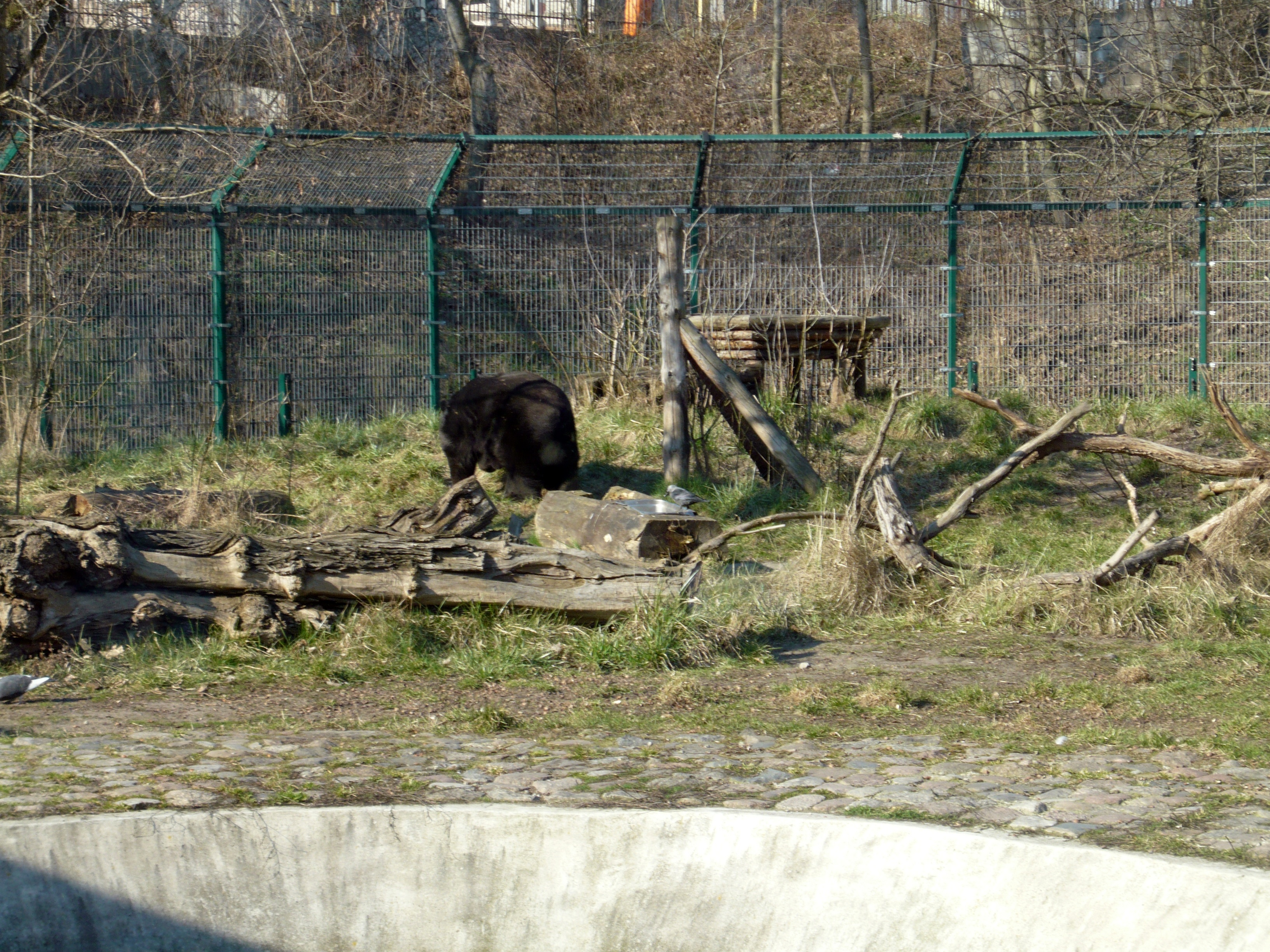
Himalayan black bear

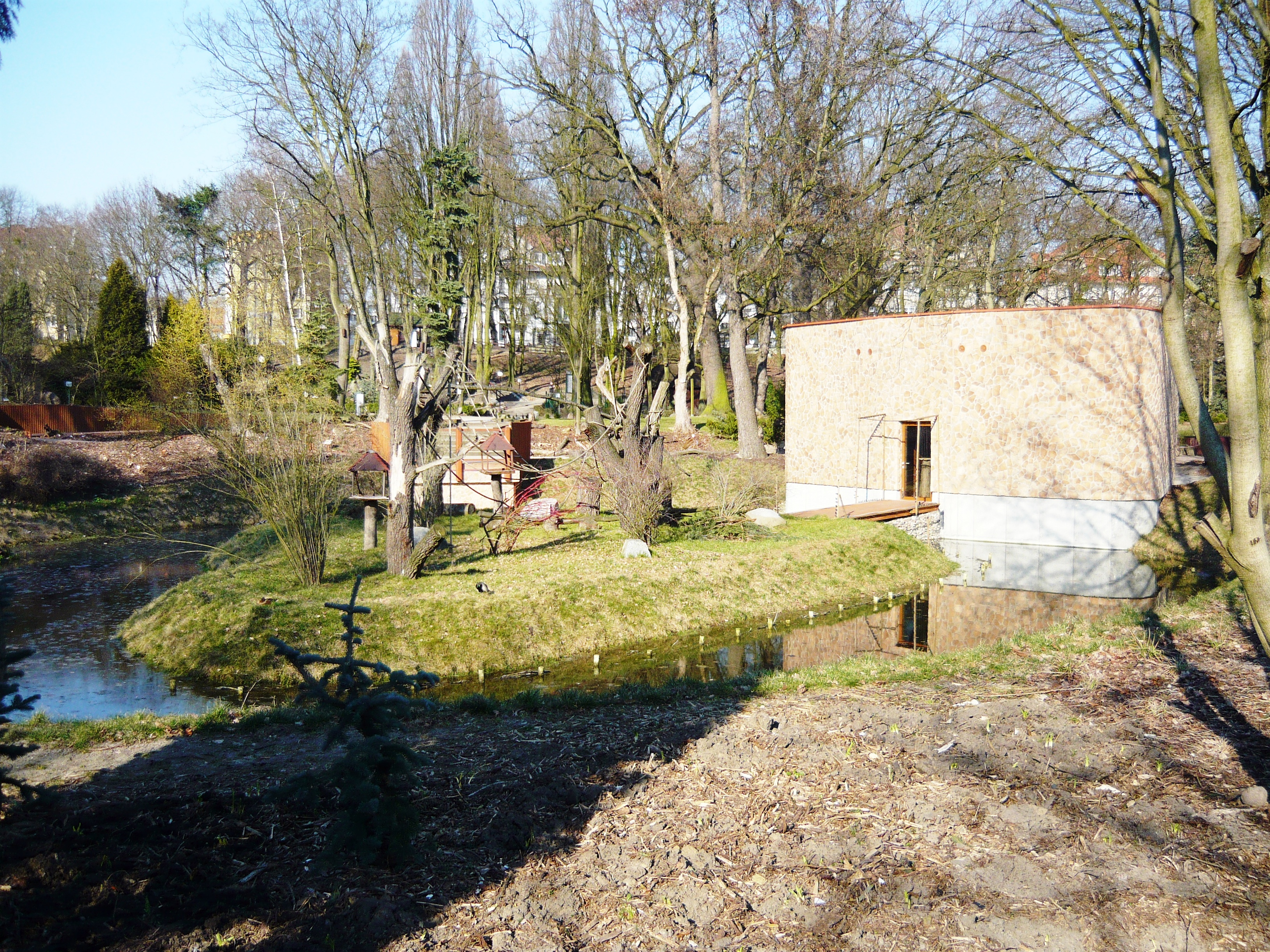
Lemurs' Island

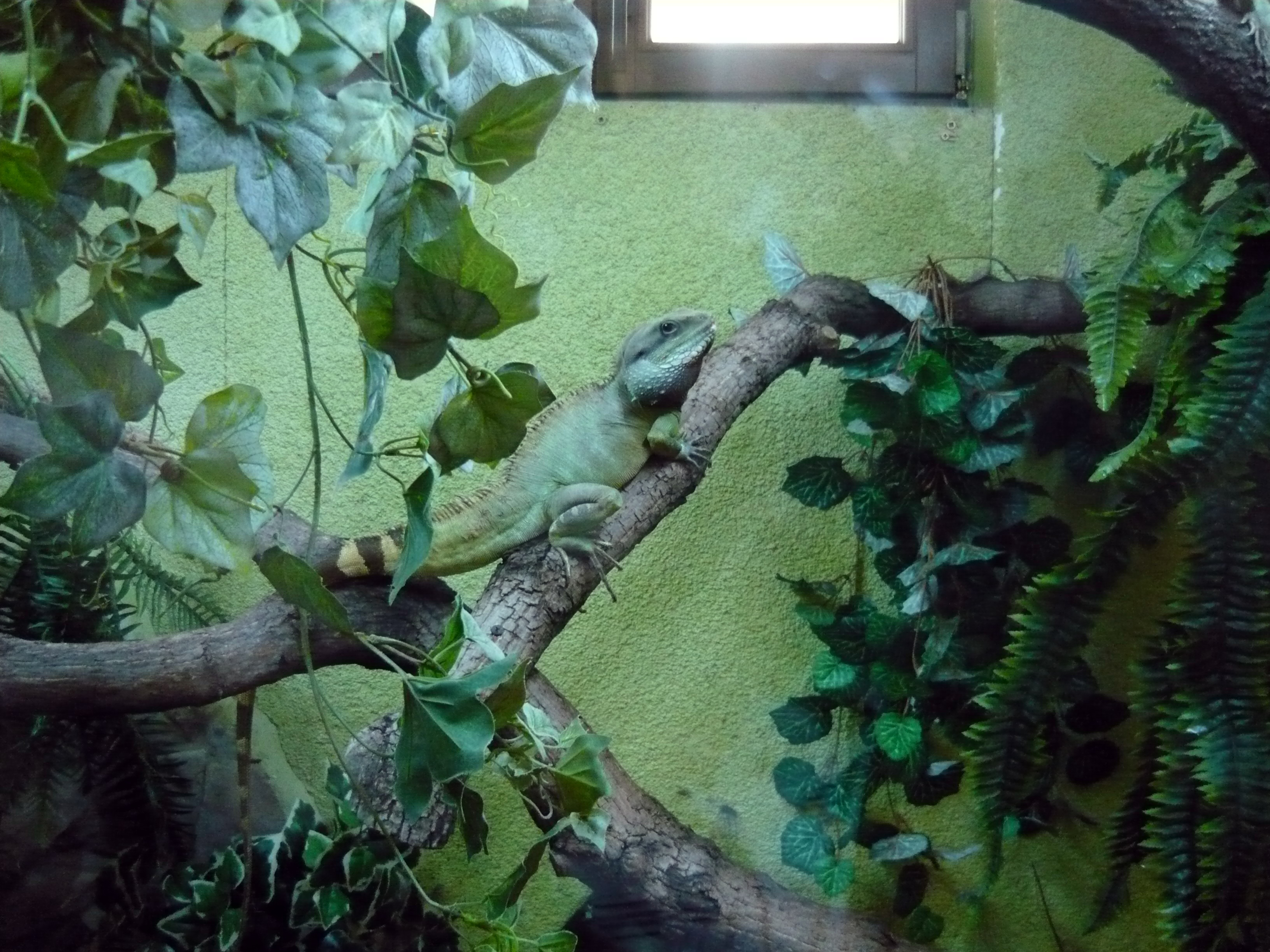
Chinese water dragon in the zoo's herpetarium

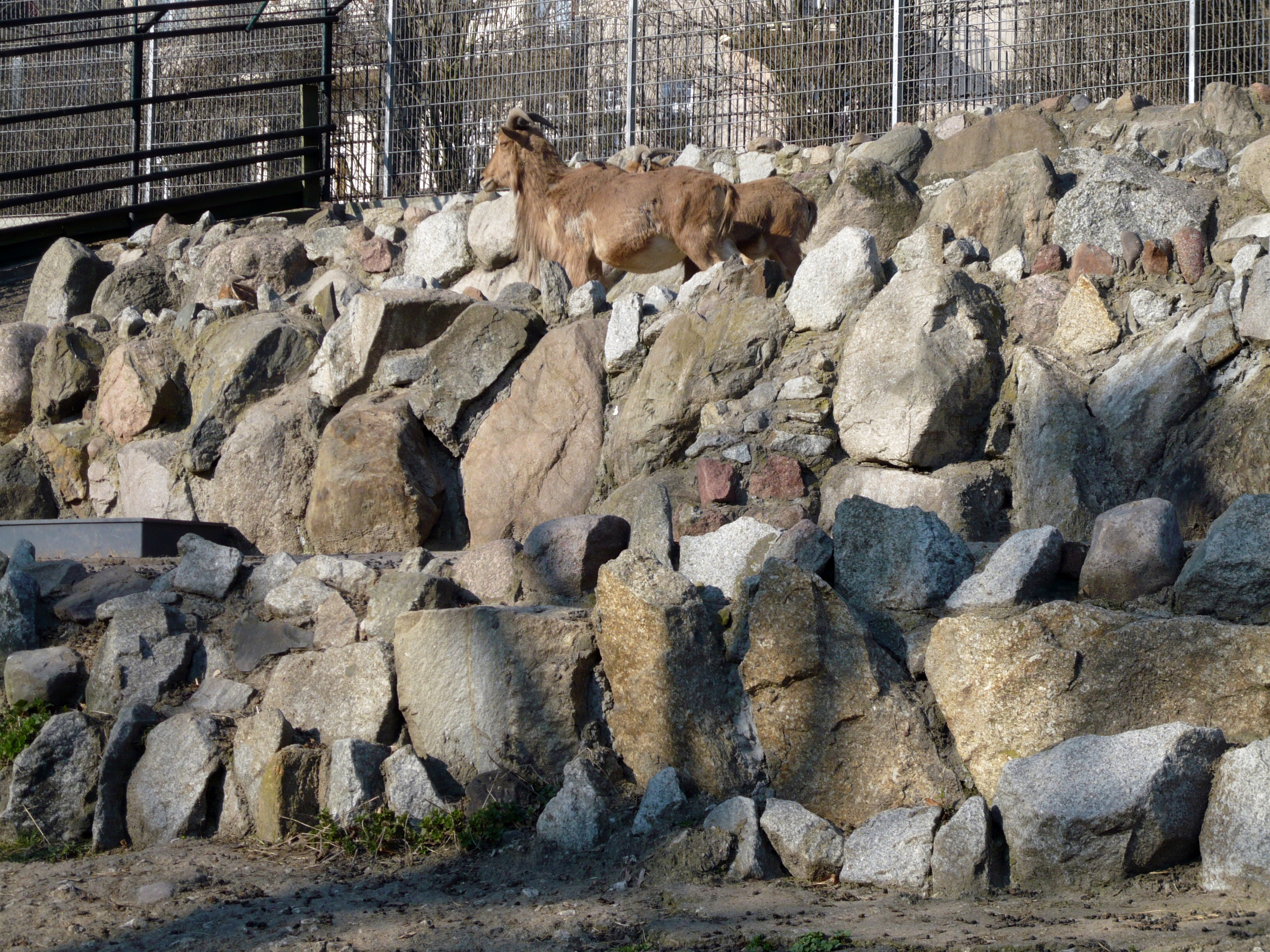
Barbary sheep

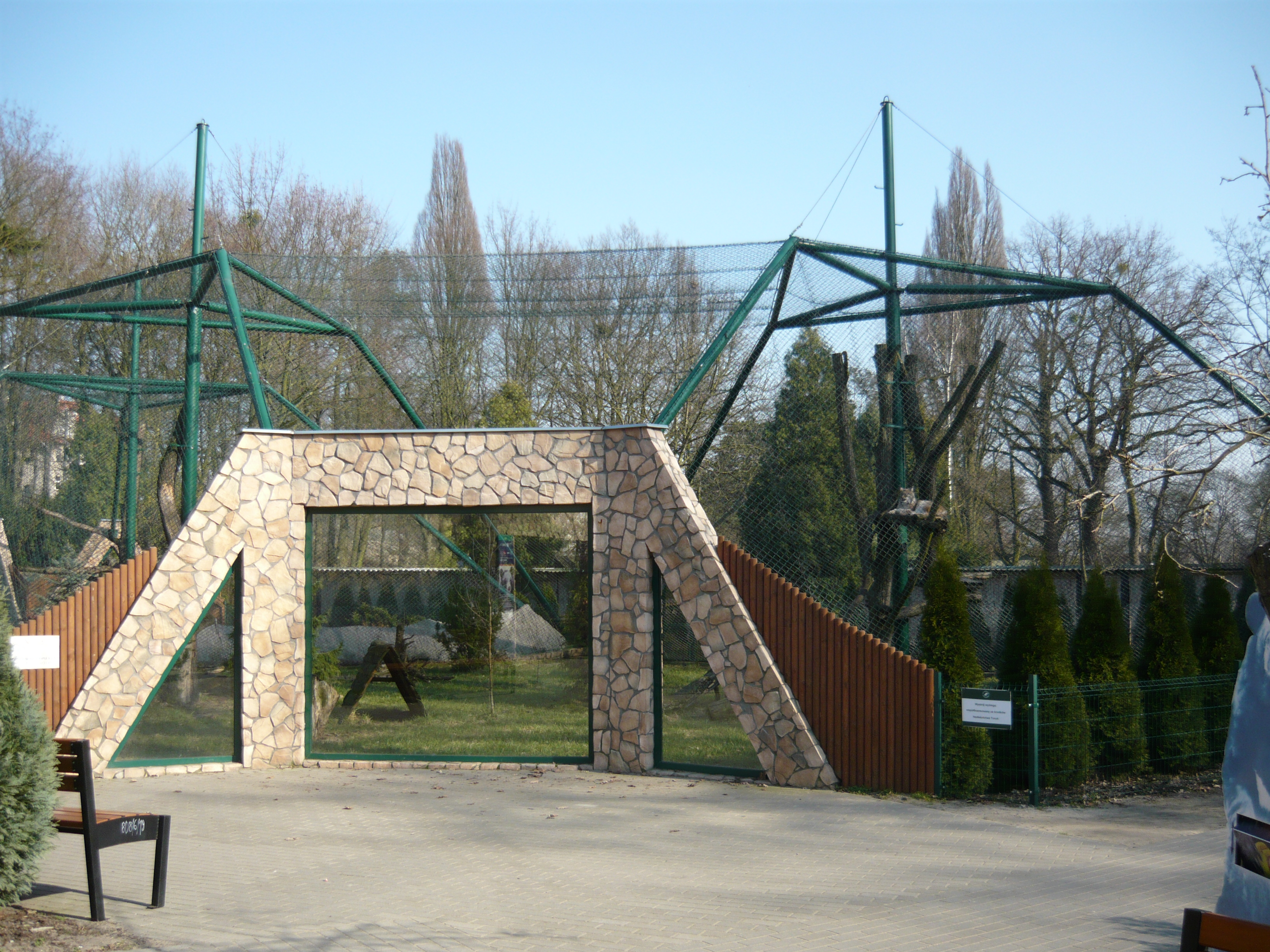
Big cats Pavilion

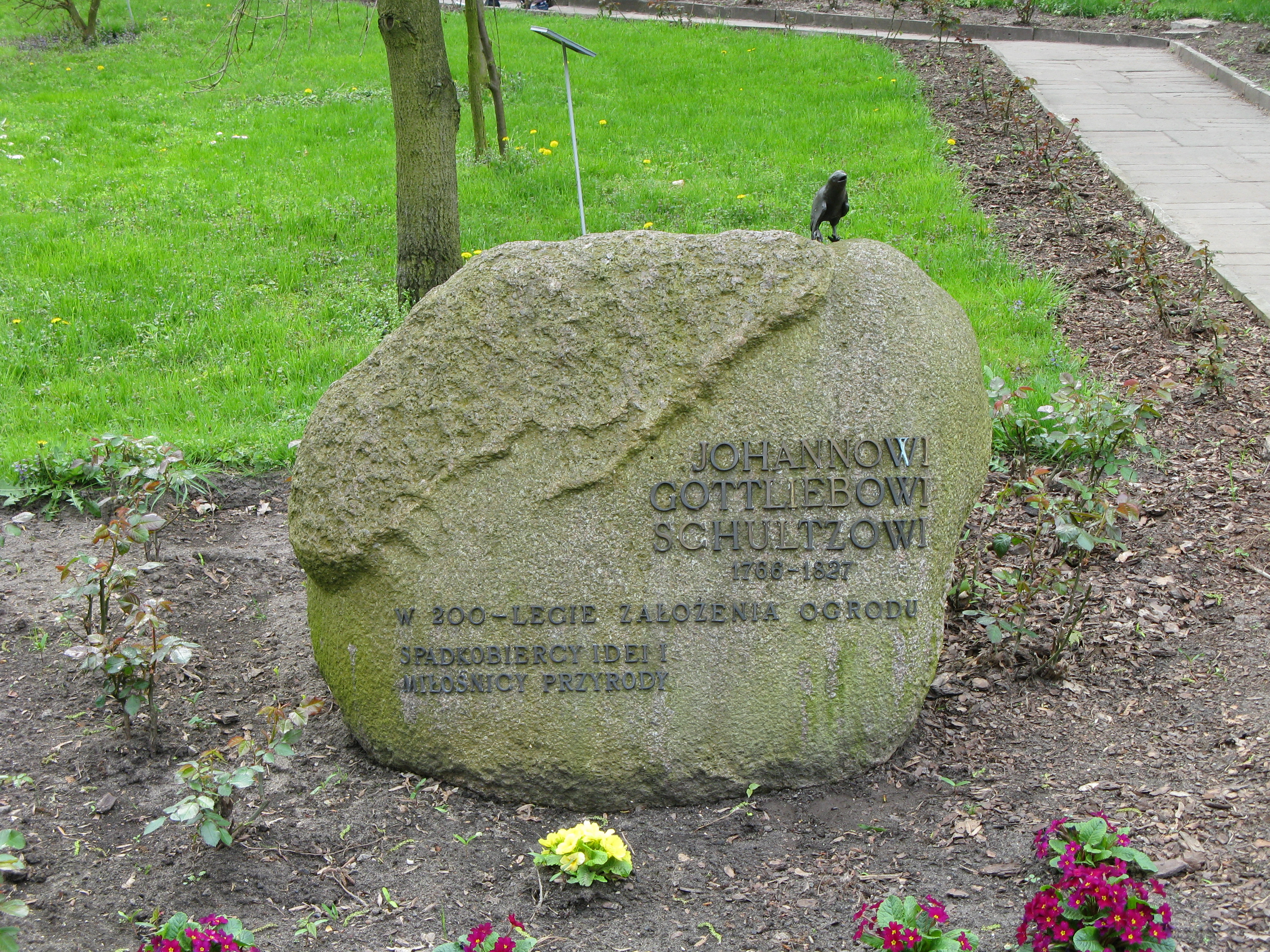
A commemorative stone devoted to Johann Gottlieb Schultz

Video presentation

== See also ==
- Warsaw Zoo
- Wrocław Zoo
- Poznań Zoo
