= Aalborg Zoo =

Zoo in Aalborg, Denmark

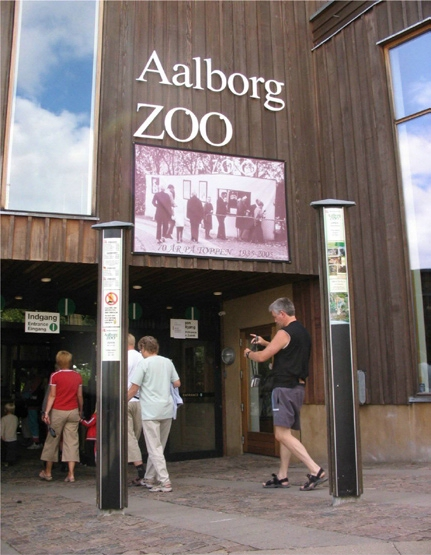
- Zoo Entrance
- Interactive map of Aalborg Zoo
- 57.0368°N 9.8982°E
- Date opened: April 1935
- Location: Aalborg, Denmark
- Land area: 8 ha (20 acres)
- No. of animals: 1,500+ (December 2011)
- No. of species: 126 (December 2011)
- Annual visitors: 375,000
- Memberships: EAZA, WAZA
- Website: aalborgzoo.dk

Aalborg Zoo is a zoo located near the center of Aalborg in Denmark. Every year, Aalborg Zoo is visited by around 375,000 guests. The zoo covers 8 hectares (20 acres), and keeps more than 1,500 animals belonging to 126 species.

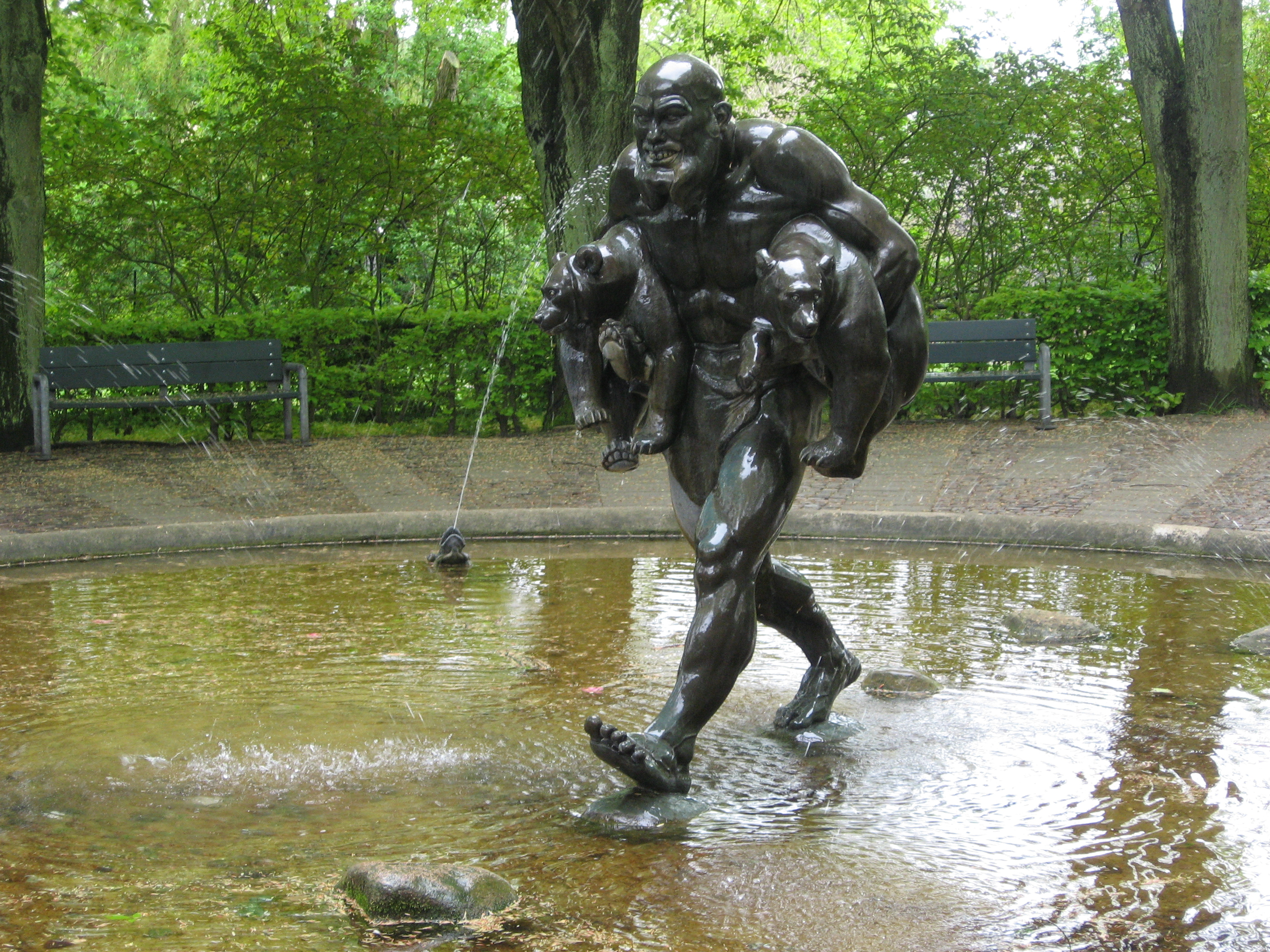
The statue Det gode kup appears at the entrance to Aalborg zoo.

At the entrance, one can see the sculpture Det gode kup ("the good bargain") from 1925, made by artist C.J. Bonnesen. The sculpture was donated to Aalborg Zoo from the Urban brewery.

== History ==
The zoo was opened in April 1935. Throughout the recent decades, Aalborg Zoo has put more emphasis on viability and conservation of nature, and today it plays a major role in various global projects on animal conservation, breeding, education, research and focus on fair trade.

== Conservation ==
Aalborg Zoo participates in many international breeding programmes in order to preserve endangered animals. Aalborg Zoo got an environment certificate and the first zoological garden, and the overall purpose of the zoo is to preserve nature. Aalborg Zoo has made their mark in many ways with projects on conservation of nature and environment. For example, Aalborg Zoo supports the Payamino Indians' efforts to preserve 60,000 hectares (150,000 acres) of endangered rainforest in Ecuador.

To simulate the natural food chain for predators, the zoo accepts donations of small animals, such as guinea pigs, rabbits, and chickens, which the zoo euthanizes then provides to the predator animals as fodder. In July 2025, this brought on controversy, after they posted a reminder of this, offering tax deductions. Opponents have criticised it as unethical, as the zoo could use regular store-bought meat instead. Supporters have approved of it, citing expert statement that it is healthier for the predators being fed, and calling it a moral alternative to regular euthanasia (which would dispose of the body afterwards).
