= Ostrava Zoo =

Zoo in the Czech Republic

Coordinates: 49°50′44″N 18°19′30″E

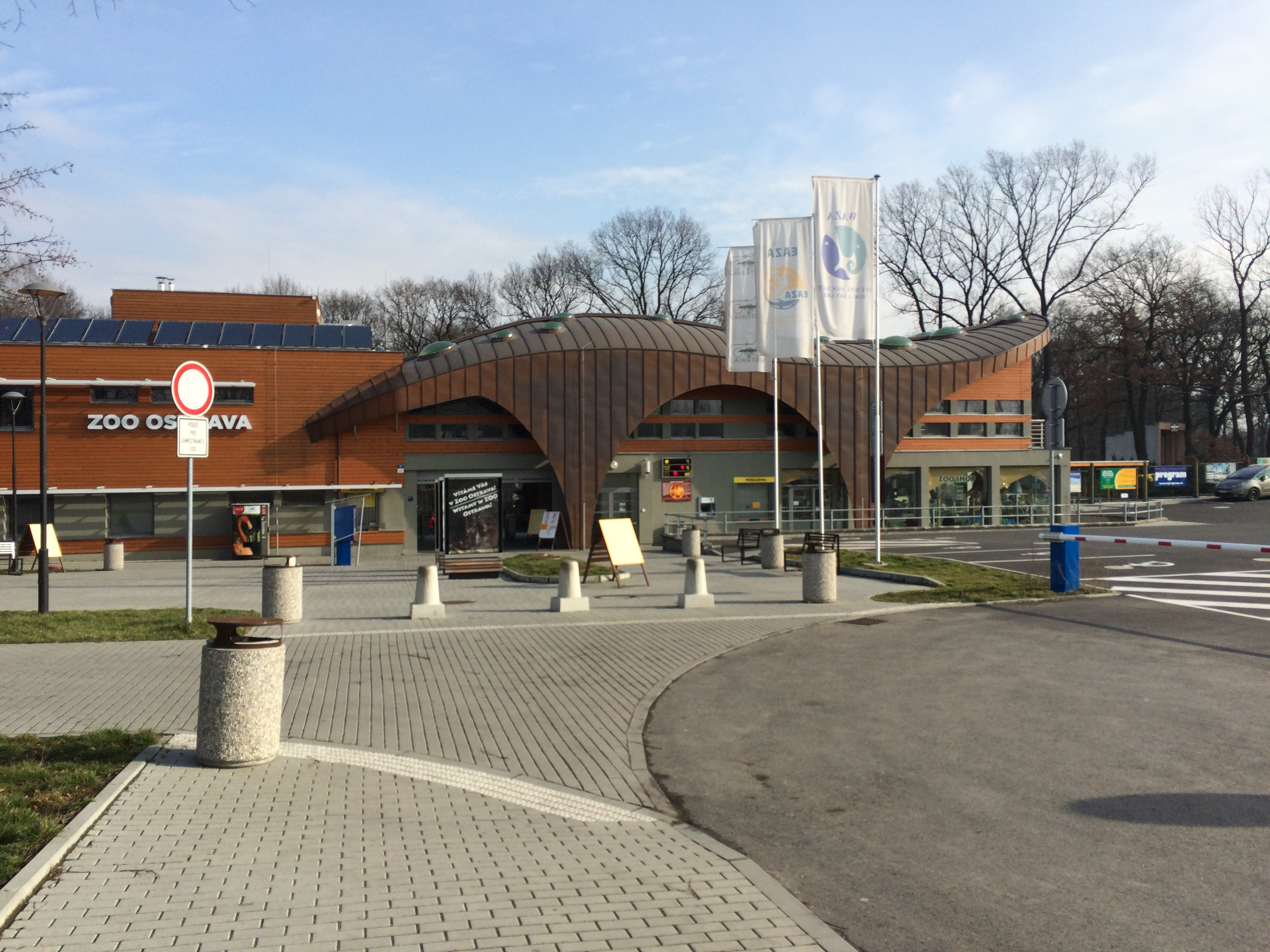
- Entrance
- Interactive map of Ostrava Zoo
- Date opened: 1951
- Location: Michálkovická 197, 710 00 Ostrava
- Land area: 100 hectares (250 acres)
- No. of animals: 3994
- No. of species: 394
- Memberships: EEP, EAZA
- Website: http://www.zoo-ostrava.cz/

Ostrava Zoo, (Zoologická zahrada Ostrava) is a zoo, located in Ostrava in the Czech Republic.

Ostrava Zoo was founded as Kunčičky Zoo in 1951, in an area called the Miners' Park in Ostrava-Kunčičky. In 1956, construction of a new zoo in Stromovka park was undertaken, and in 1960 the zoo and animals were transferred to the new location.

In 1996 Ostrava Zoo became a member in the European Association of Zoos and Aquaria (EAZA). It is open every day from 9:00 a.m. until 6:00 p.m.
