= Verband der Zoologischen Gärten =

The Verband der Zoologischen Gärten ("Association of Zoological Gardens"; VdZ), until 2014 Verband Deutscher Zoodirektoren (German Federation of Zoo Directors, VDZ), is the leading association of scientifically managed zoological gardens in German-speaking countries. A zoo is considered to be scientifically managed if it is run by a director with an academic education, usually a biologist or a veterinarian, and if he or she follows and implements scientific standards of zoology, conservation, and zoo pedagogy.

== History ==
The association was founded in 1887, making it the oldest zoo association in the world. It originated from the annual meetings of zoo directors from the European area at the animal auctions in the zoo Antwerp. From the 1920s, the association expanded through members from Central and Northern Europe. He became the nucleus of the first International Zoodirektorenverbandes, which was founded in 1935 at the annual convention in Basel. In 1946, after the Second World War, the reestablishment of the International Zoodirektorenverband took place. The VDZ was reconstituted in 1951. In 1987, exactly 100 years after its founding, the VDZ attended its annual conferenceRheine a new statute, which made the loose association with its annual meetings a registered association with a solid association structure. From 2009 until relocation to Berlin in 2015, the office of the association was in Bern. In 2014, it was decided to rename the association in the Association of Zoological Gardens (VdZ) at the annual convention in Münster.

== Association structure ==
Zoological gardens in Germany, Austria, Switzerland, Denmark, Estonia, and Spain belong to the VdZ as institutional members. The association also has around 90 corresponding, associate, patron and honorary members. The association language is German. The association's body published the magazine The Zoological Garden until the end of 2017. It is also an organ of the World Association of Zoos and Aquariums (WAZA). In addition, 40 VDC members are institutional members of WAZA. The cooperation with the European Association of Zoos and Aquaria EAZA, in which VdZ zoos are also members, is also very close. Once a year, the members of the VdZ meet for their annual meeting in a member zoo. These meetings consist of scientific sessions and business meetings, a tour of the host zoo and a scientific excursion.

The board consists of nine members. It is composed as follows (as of 2016):

- President: Olivier Pagan - Zoo Basel
- Vice President: Jörg Junhold - Zoo Leipzig
- Treasurer: Stephan Hering-Hagenbeck - Hagenbeck Zoo
- Associate: Dag Encke - Tiergarten Nuremberg
- Assessor: Gerhard Kasbauer - Tiergarten Schönbrunn
- Assessor: Thomas Kauffels - Opel-Zoo Kronberg
- Assessor: Pia Krawinkel - ZOOM Erlebniswelt Gelsenkirchen
- Assessor: Theo Pagel - Cologne Zoo
- Assessor: Michael Martys - Alpine Zoo Innsbruck
- Managing Director is Volker Homes. The office has been in Berlin since 2015.

At the 2016 annual conference in the Euregiozoo zoo in Aachen, the association adopted a new mission statement.

== Visitor frequency ==
From 1999 to 2003, the number of visitors to the member zoos in Germany had been between 26 and 27 million. In 2004, the number rose to more than 28 million, to which the reopening of the converted Zoo on the sea in Bremerhaven contributed significantly. Thereafter, overall numbers continued to rise, notably as a result of the total renewal of the zoos in Gelsenkirchen, Hanover and Leipzig, which saw massive growth, the opening of the tropical aquarium Hagenbeck in 2007, the Darwineum in Rostock in 2012 and the growing popularity of the borderline Zoos of Aachen and Nordhornin the neighboring country Holland. Most of the zoos in Mecklenburg-Vorpommern were also able to benefit from the growing popularity of the state as a holiday destination and others, such As Dresden, Heidelberg, Neuwied and Osnabrück paid off investments in new facilities. In 2014, 52 of the 53 German member zoos (the Aquazoo Düsseldorf was closed due to renovation) recorded around 33.4 million admissions. The five members in Austria received 3.7 million visitors and the five in Switzerland over 4.3 million. The two member zoos outside the German-speaking area, the Tallinn Zoo and the Loro Parquein Tenerife, together received 1.4 million visitors. According to the fact sheet of the VdZ, 41 million people visited the VdZ zoos in 2016. Two million visitors will also have an annual pass.

== Commitment to wildlife conservation ==
To preserve endangered species, VdZ zoos run 124 international breeding programs. In 2015, animals from 48 species were released.

== Education and Research ==
85% of all VdZ zoos have a zoo school. Every year, one million zoo visitors use special educational offers. With the participation of VdZ zoos, 400 scientific studies on animal biological and nature conservation relevant topics are published annually.

== Literature ==
- Heinz-Georg Klös & Hans Frädrich (ed.): 100 years association of German zoo directors. In: Bongo. Contributions to the nursery. 13, 1987, (special volume).
- Verband Deutscher Zoodirektoren eV (Hrsg.): Gardens for Animals - Experiences for People. The Zoological Gardens of the VDZ. 125 years Association of German Zoo Directors JP Bachem Verlag, Cologne 2012. ISBN 978-3-7616-2555-2.

== See also ==
- List of zoo associations
