= National Reptile Zoo =

Coordinates: 52°39′20″N 7°13′53″W

- Date opened: 2006
- Location: Kilkenny, Ireland
- Owner: James Hennessy
- Website: https://www.nrz.ie/

The National Reptile Zoo is a zoo in Kilkenny, County Kilkenny, Ireland. Its collection includes reptiles, amphibians, and invertebrates; it has 120 individual animals from over 50 species.

== Collection ==
The zoo's collection includes crocodiles, pythons, giant monitor lizards, geckos, poison dart frogs and tarantulas.

The zoo has a night room exhibit with an artificially reversed day-night cycle, so that visitors can observe nocturnal animals while they are active.

== History ==
The zoo was built by James Hennessy, who leased a 2,000 square metre farm shed and built the first animal enclosures himself. It was originally named "Reptile Village". The zoo later changed its name and by 2015, it premises had expanded to an area of 6,000 square metres.

In April 2019, a fire broke out at the zoo, killing a snake and injuring other animals. The zoo's anti-venom stock, which was the only anti-venom stock in Ireland, was also destroyed. In May 2019, it was announced that the zoo would move to a larger location on the outskirts of Kilkenny city.

In 2020, the zoo lost income during the COVID-19 pandemic and had to rely on public donations. After adopting COVID-19 protections and social distancing, the zoo received a record number of visitors in 2022.
