= Opole Zoo =

Zoo Opole Ogród Zoologiczny w Opolu
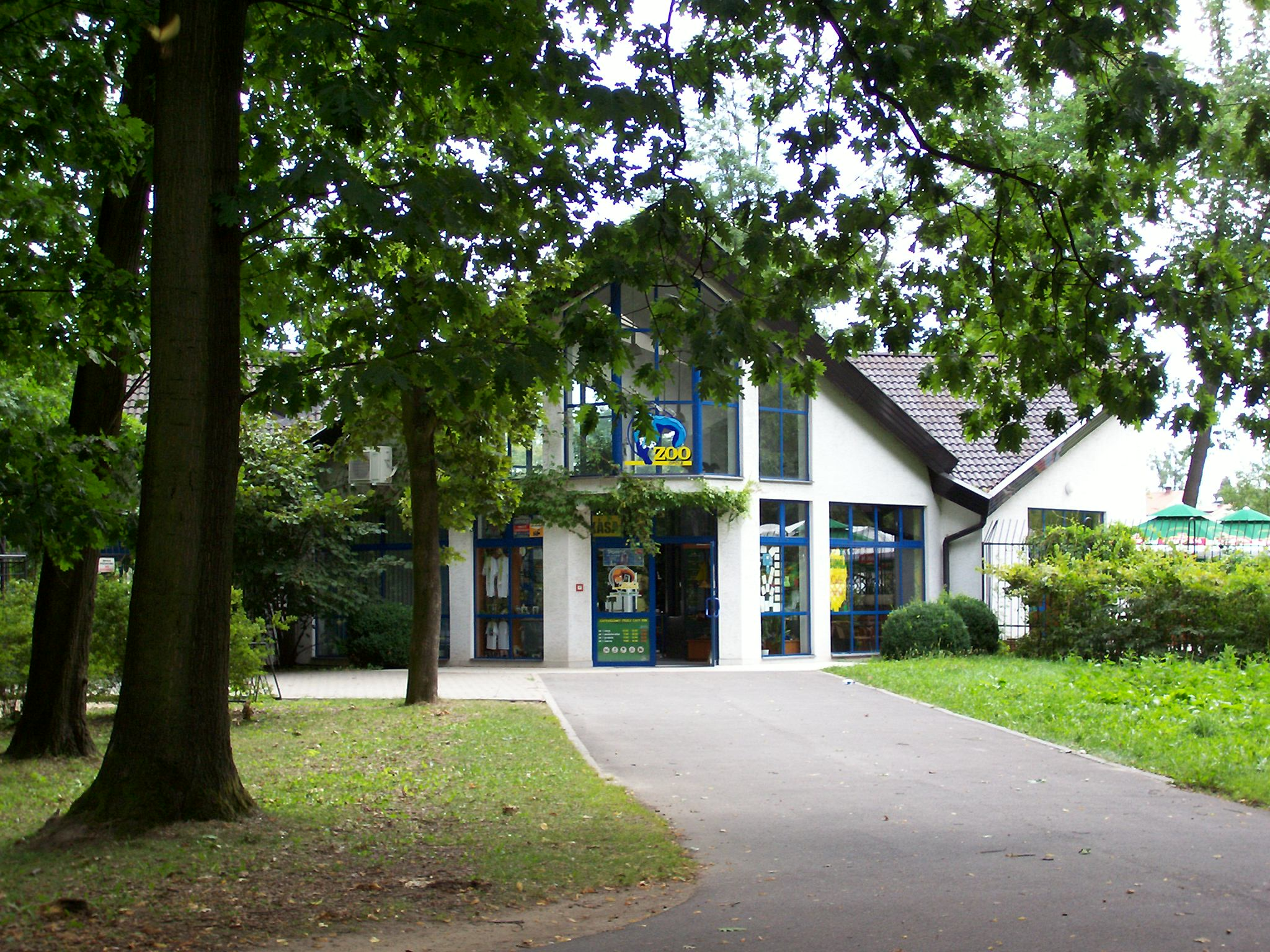
- Zoo entrance
- Interactive map of Zoo Opole; Ogród Zoologiczny w Opolu
- 50°39′18″N 17°55′28″E
- Date opened: 1930
- Location: Opole, Poland
- Land area: 20 hectares (49 acres)
- No. of animals: 1000
- No. of species: 240
- Website: www.zoo.opole.pl

Zoo Opole (Polish: Ogród Zoologiczny w Opolu), is a zoo in the city of Opole, Poland. It was founded in 1930. About 20 hectares (49 acres) in extent, it houses around 1000 animals of about 240 different species. It is located on Bolko Island in the Oder River.

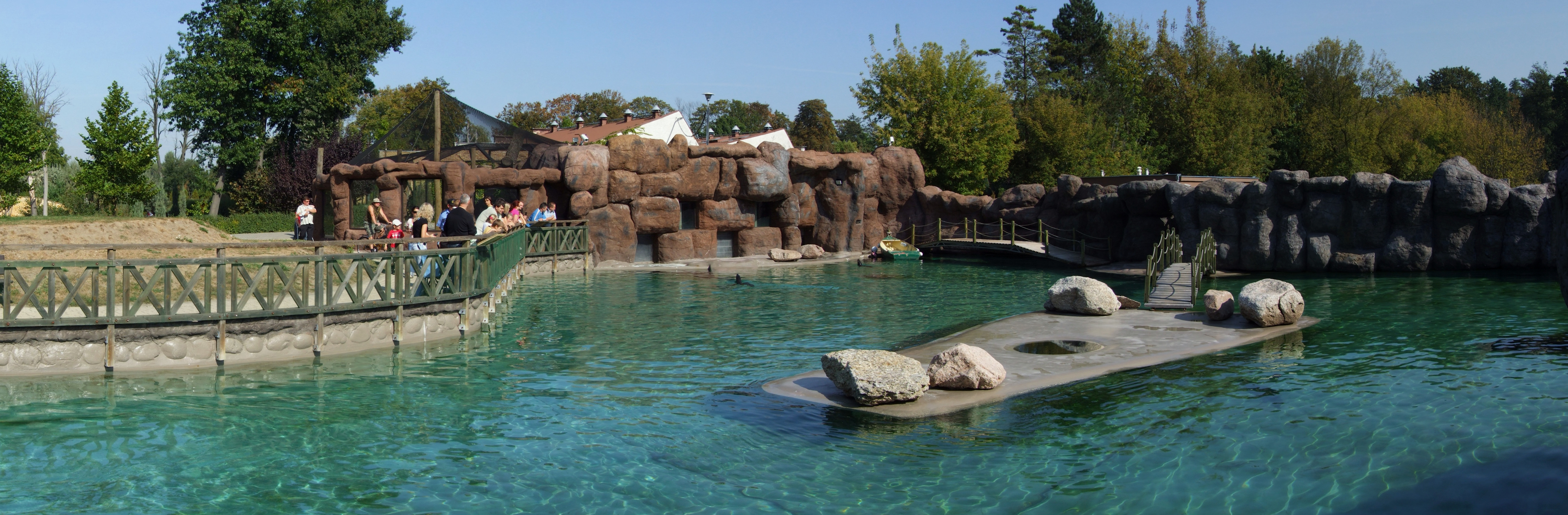
California sea lions in Zoo Opole
