= Rostock Zoo =

Zoo in Germany

Zoologischer Garten Rostock
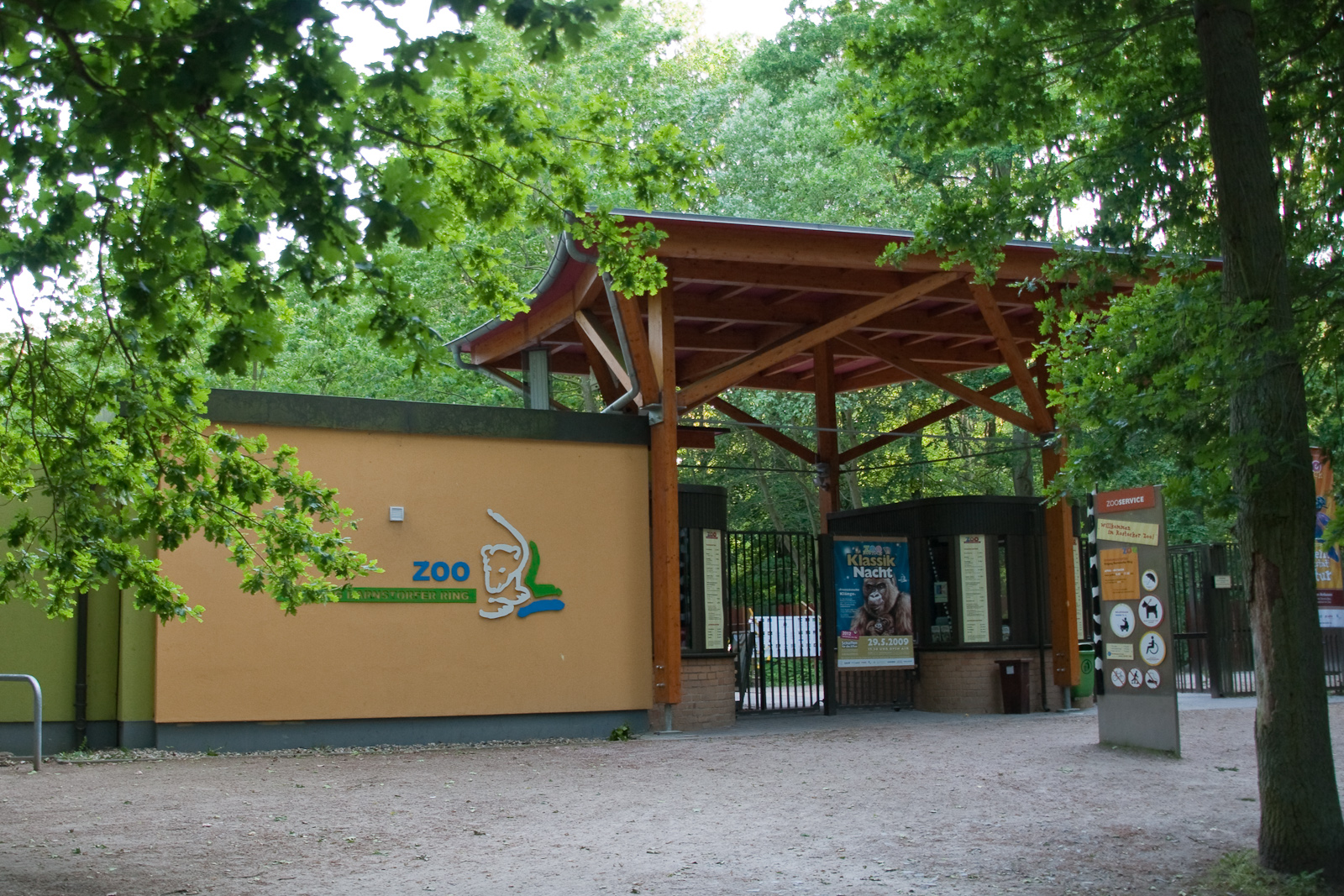
- Entrance at Barnstorfer Ring
- Interactive map of Zoologischer Garten Rostock
- 54°4′41.1″N 12°5′25.26″E
- Date opened: 4 January 1899
- Location: Rennbahnallee 21; 18059 Rostock
- Land area: 56 ha (140 acres)
- No. of animals: 4500 (2012)
- No. of species: 320 (2012)
- Annual visitors: 637.000 (2013)
- Owner: Zoologischer Garten Rostock gGmbH
- Website: www.zoo-rostock.de

Rostock Zoo (German: Zoologischer Garten Rostock) is a zoo in the city of Rostock, Germany, founded in 1899. It covers 56 hectares and with 4,500 animals from 320 species, Rostock Zoo is the largest zoo on the German east coast. Rostock Zoo is studbook keeper of Polar bears within the European Endangered Species Programme. The director of Rostock Zoo is Udo Nagel.

== History ==
=== From foundation to 1945 ===
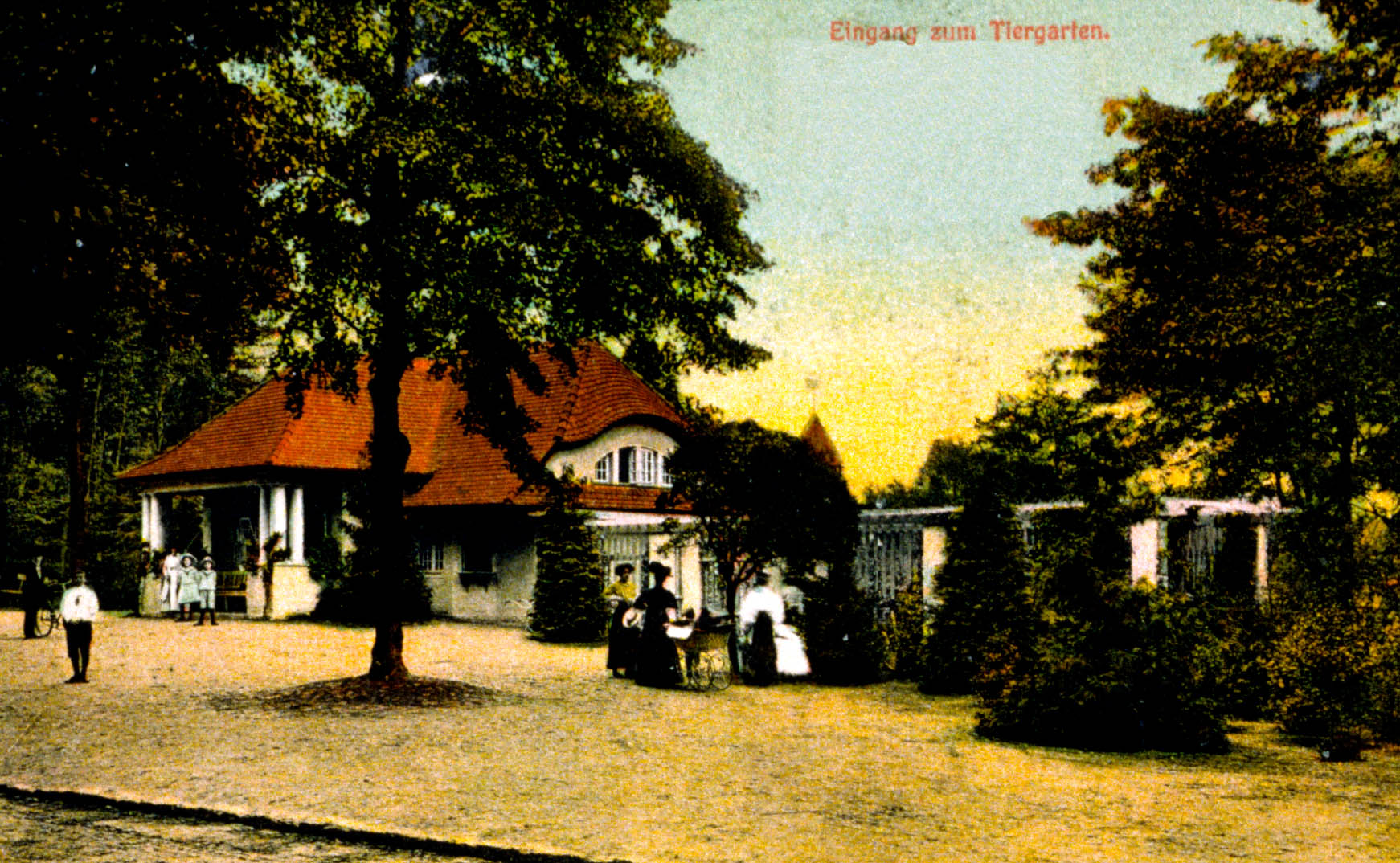
Entrance to Rostock Zoo in the twenties.

Around 1864, previous military grounds were transferred into a garden, and by 1866 completed and named Trotzenburg. In 1898, the first fenced animals were introduced, as wild boar and different kind of deer. The next year was the official opening for the Hirschgarten an der Trotzenburg, and the first zookeeper, Carl Lange, was employed to take care of the different animals.

=== 1945 to 1989 ===
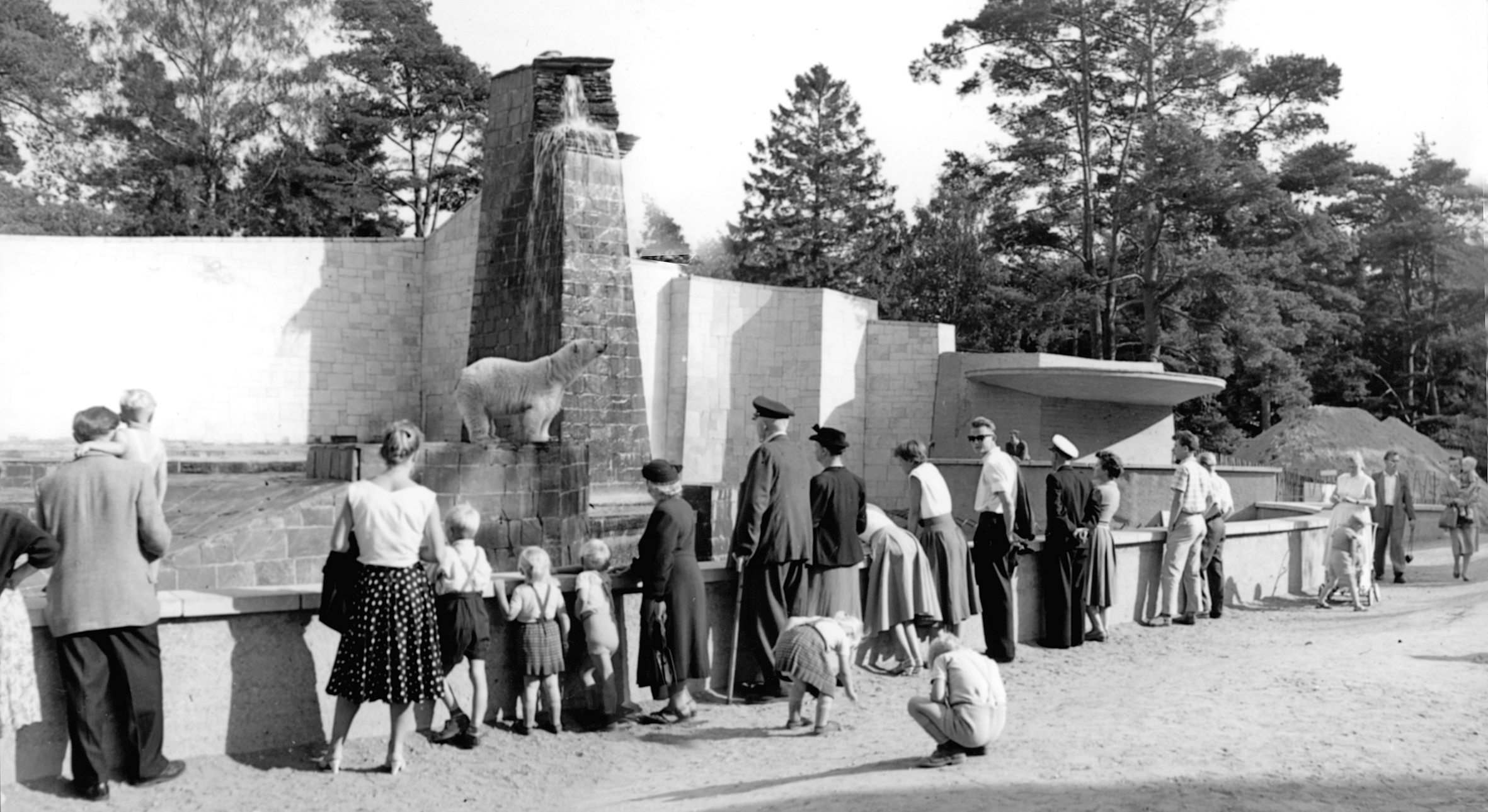
Building of the Bärenburg im Rostocker Zoo

The air bombings during World War II on the city of Rostock were extremely heavy. All buildings and enclosures in Rostock Zoo were destroyed. In 1951, the garden architect, Arno Lehmann, started the renovation and rebuilding of the zoo. Many people from the town volunteered in this work, with direct manual work, as well as with their support. The zoo was re-opened for the public in 1952, was enlarged in 1956, and renamed and refounded 16 January 1956 as Zoologischen Garten Rostocks

In 1960, the two first Asian elephants arrived to the new built elephant enclosure, and later Rostock Zoo took over the breeding of Arabian horse and became the largest breeder of the horse in the entire East Germany. In 1963, the first polar bear was born in the zoo, and it was given the name Katja. In 1973, the zoo was once again enlarged with an added 56 Hectares, coordinated with a new master plan.

Since 1980, Rostock Zoo is studbook keeper of Polar bears within the European Endangered Species Programme.

=== Since 1989 ===
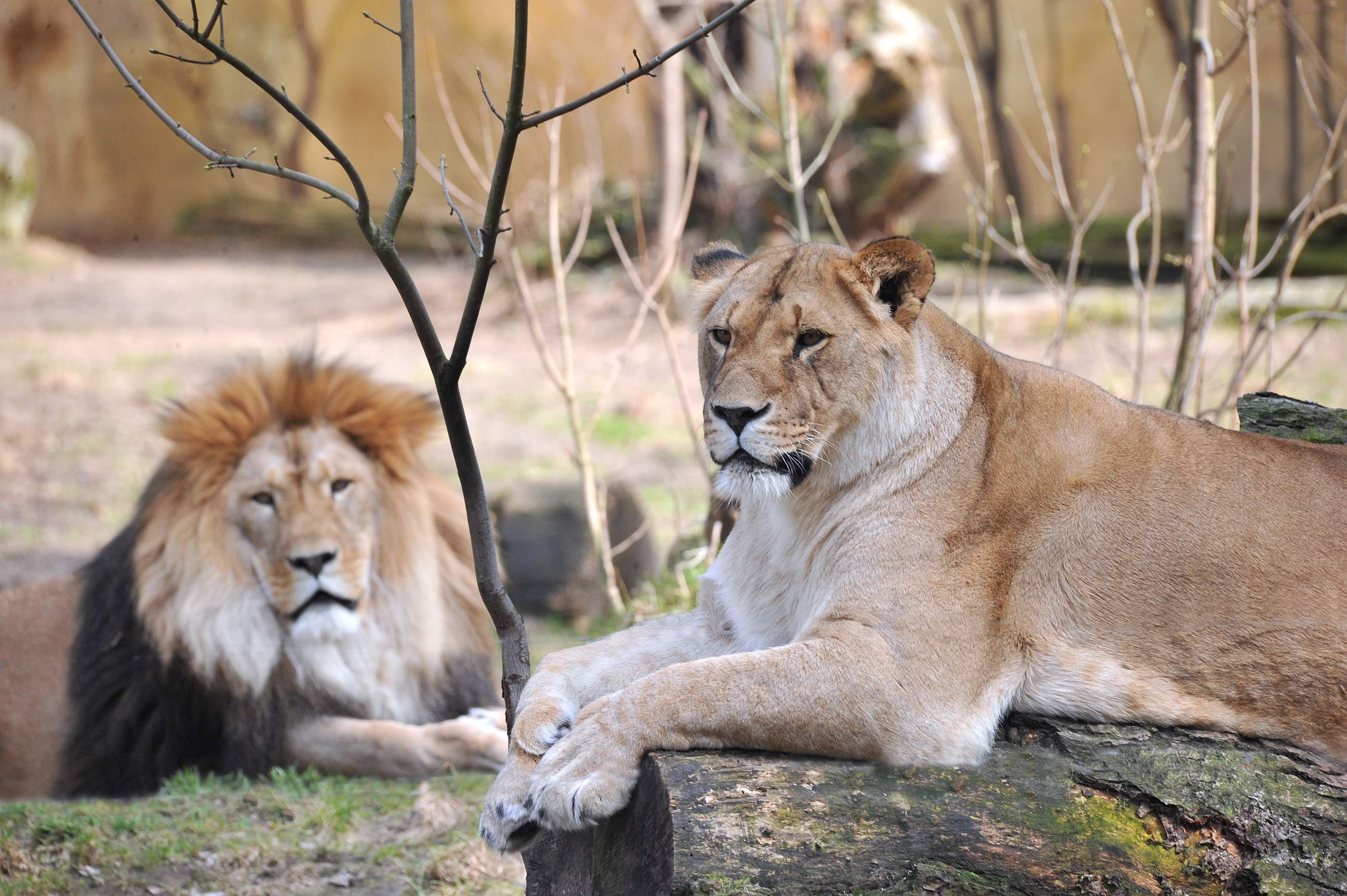
Lions in Rostock Zoo

In 1992, Gemeinnützige GmbH Zoologischer Garten Rostock was founded and chaired by Rostock Zoo director, Udo Nagel, and from 1992 until 1998, several new animal enclosures were established, among them painted dogs, eared seals and Hussar monkey, and since then more enclosures has been created or renovated.

In 1999, the zoo celebrated the Jubileum named 100 Jahre Tiergärtnerei, after being a garden for a hundred years.

The female African elephant, Sara, who was the oldest in a European zoo, died 2013, and ended the Zoo's keeping of elephants, and the elephant enclosure was replaced with Pygmy hippopotamus.

== Darwineum ==
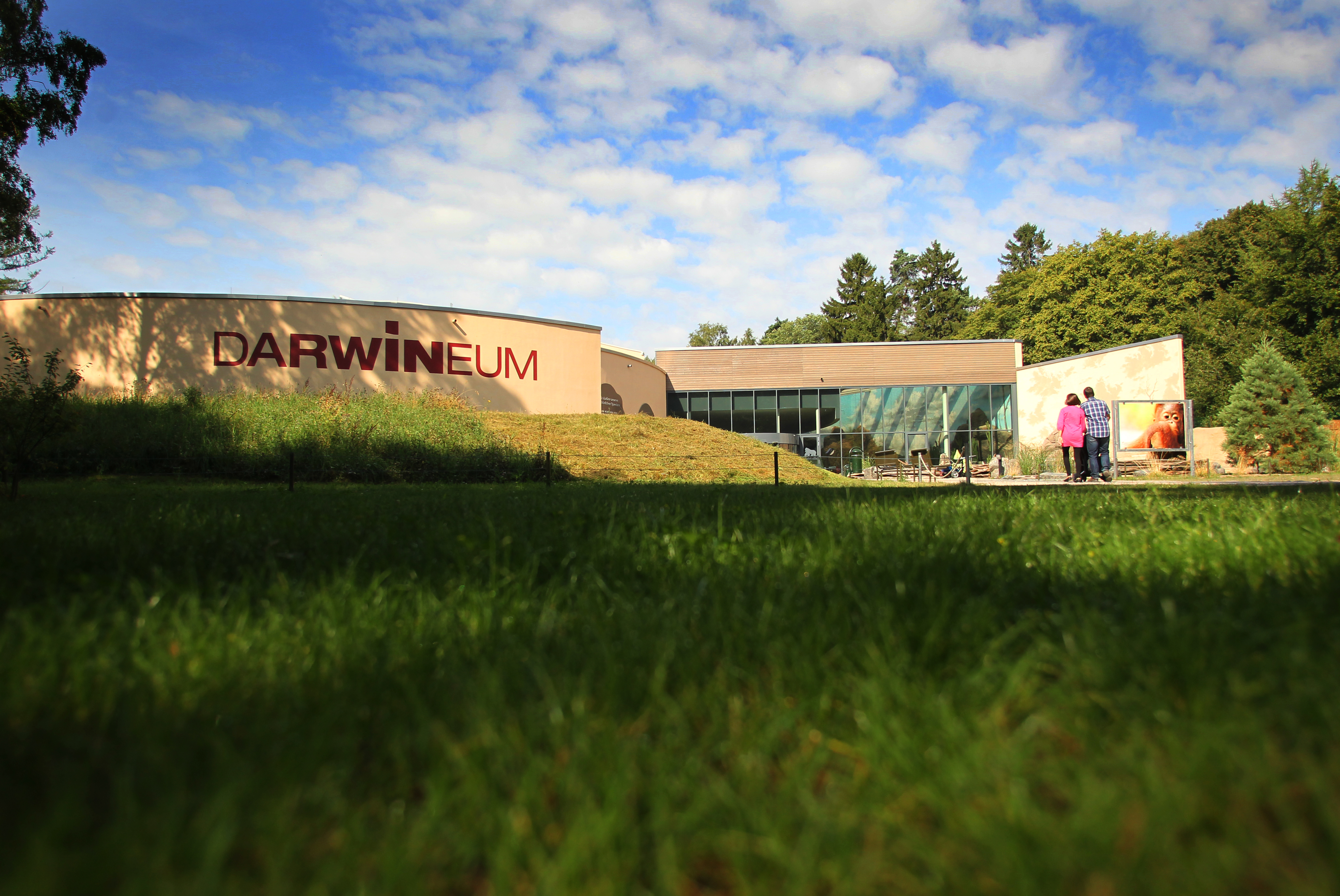
Darwineum

Named after the originator of the theory of biological evolution by natural selection, Charles Darwin, Darwineum was opened on 8 September 2012. This living museum, which covers 20,000 m^{2}, and contains over 80 species of animals, was the largest building project throughout Rostock Zoo history, at a cost of more than 28 million Euro.

In two interactive expositions is biological diversity on earth exposed, as well as the evolution behind it, starting with the Big Bang Theory and the creation of the Observable Universe. Theme Boxes with living fossils, aquarium with corals, seahorses and Germany's largest circular tank for jellyfish. The center of the exhibition is the Tropenhalle, a 4,000 m^{2} tropical exhibition with gibbons, gorillas, orangutans and De Brazza's monkey. Next to the Tropenhalle is an exhibition which shows the culture evolution of Man.

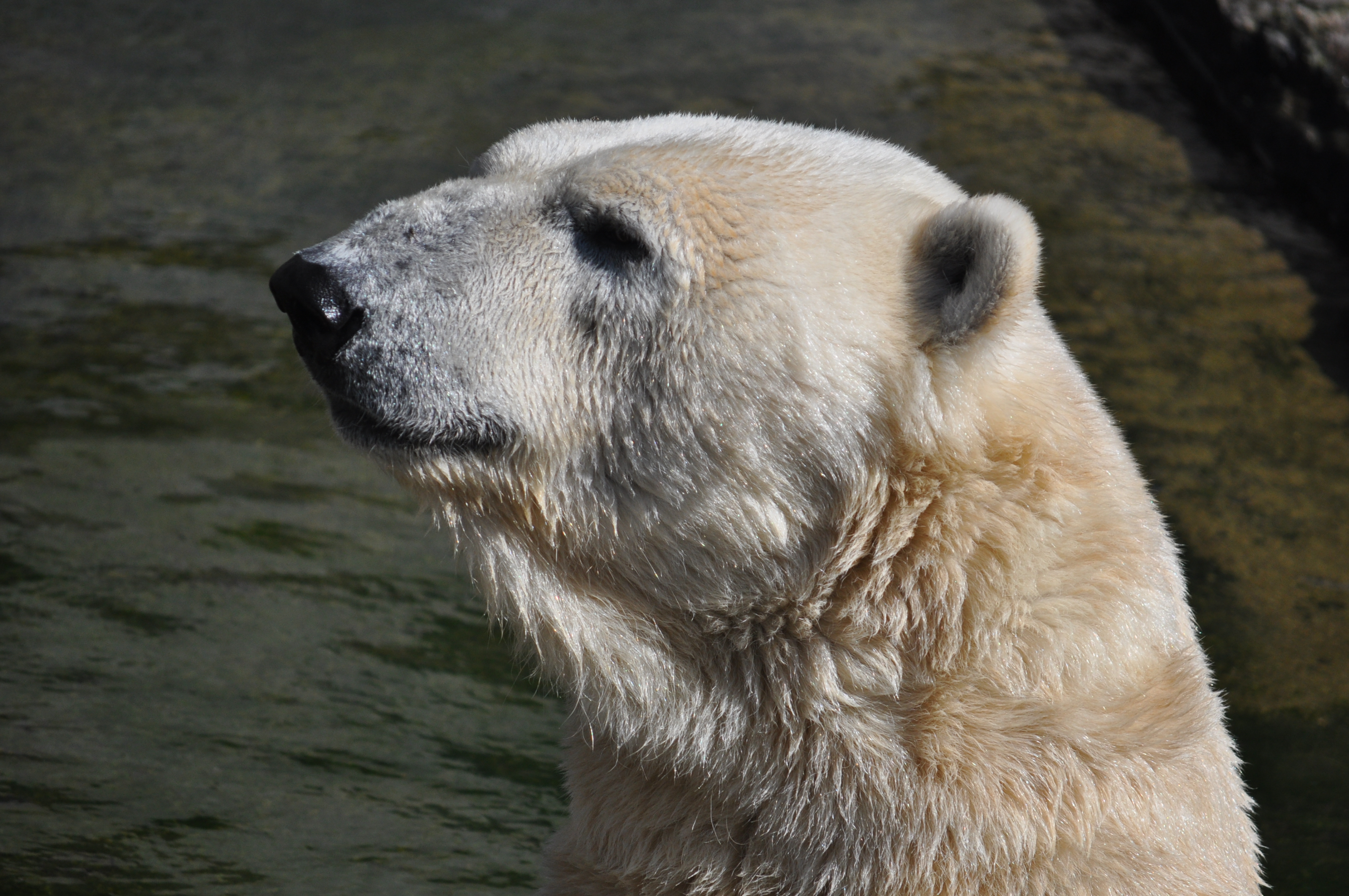
Polar bears in the Zoo

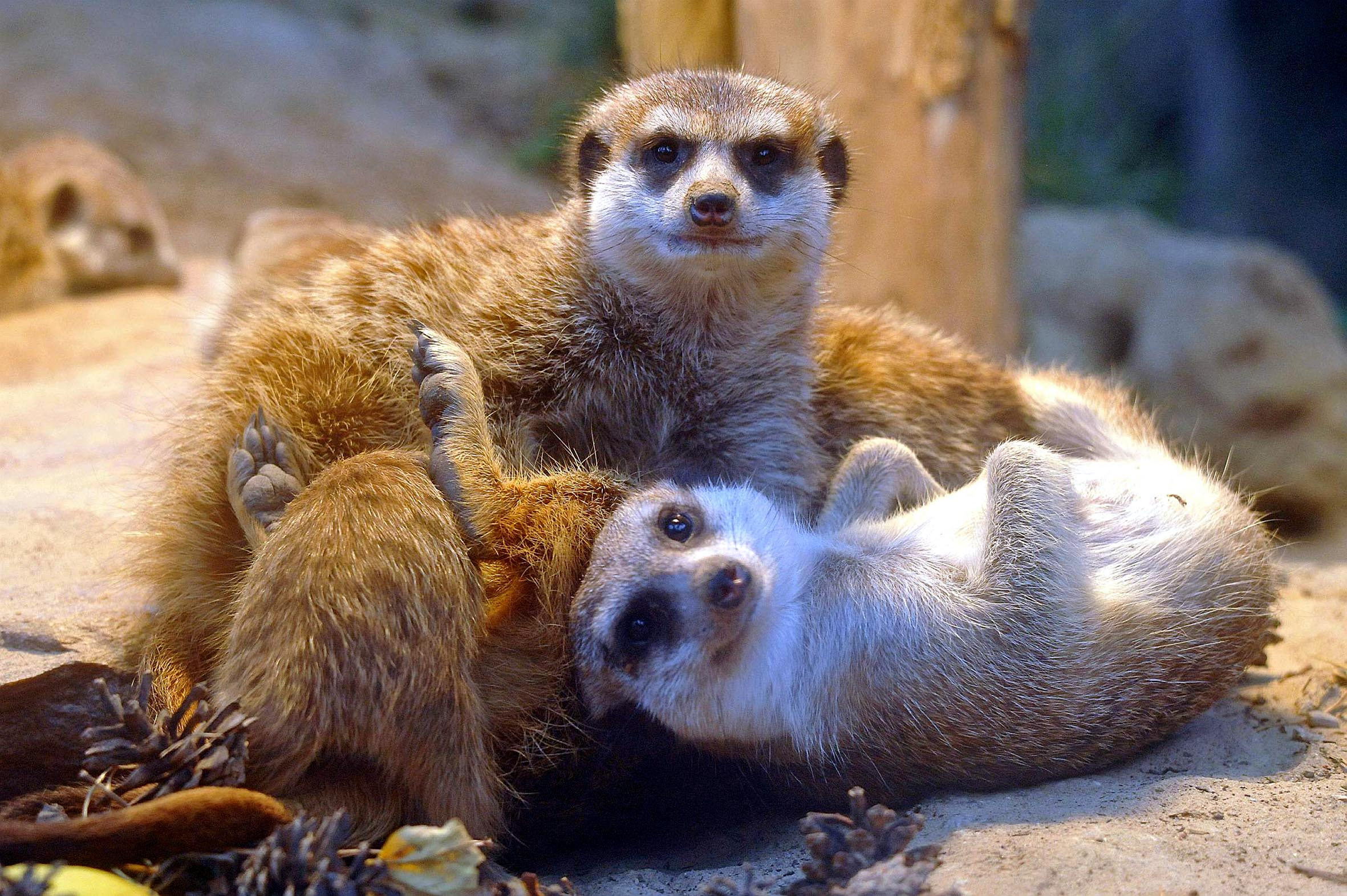
Meerkat in the Zoo

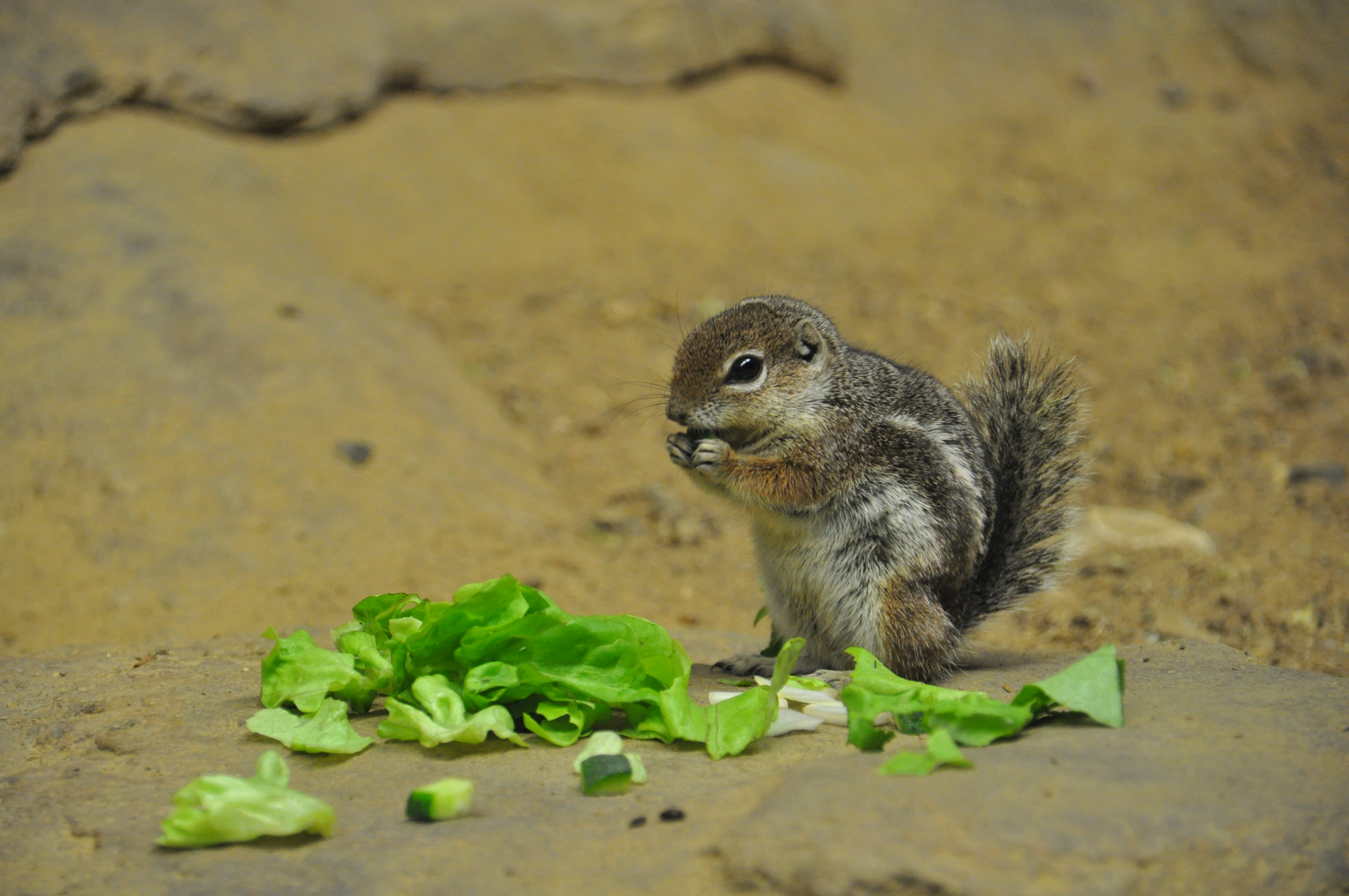
Antelope squirrel in Darwineum
