= Galway Atlantaquaria =

Aquarium in Galway

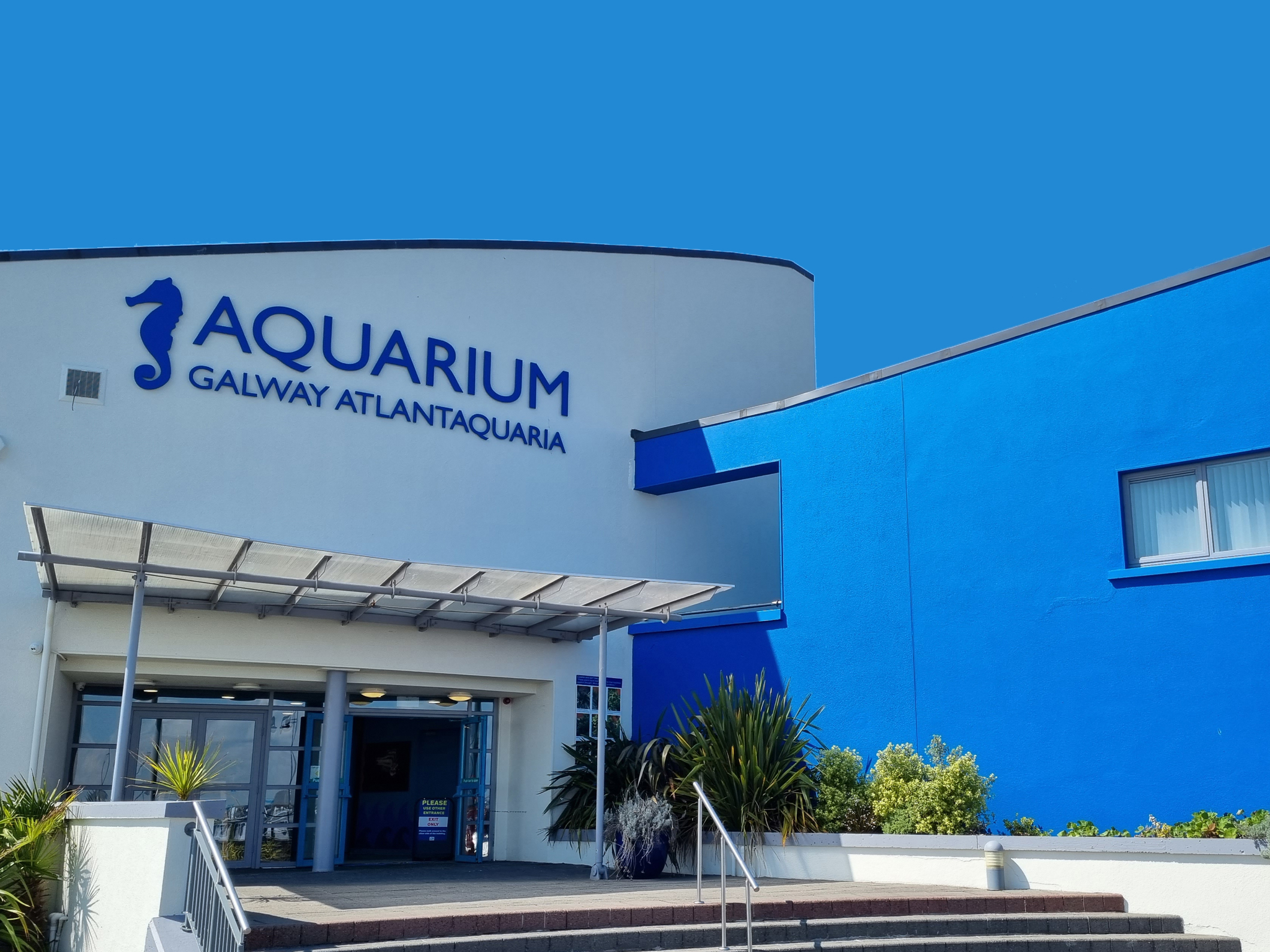
- Interactive map of Galway Atlantaquaria
- Date opened: 1999
- Location: Salthill, Galway City, Ireland
- No. of species: over 170
- Volume of largest tank: over 150,000 litres
- Annual visitors: 118,500
- Owner: Liam Twomey
- Director: Liam Twomey
- Website: nationalaquarium.ie

Galway Atlantaquaria is an aquarium in Salthill, Galway, Ireland. It is Ireland’s largest aquarium, containing over 170 species. It is a member of the British and Irish Association of Zoos and Aquariums and the European Association of Zoos and Aquaria. In 2011, it became the home of "Dessie", a 70-year-old lobster and Northern Ireland's largest lobster. It has many years of expertise in wildlife rehabilitation.

== History ==
In 2017, it began plans to build Ireland's first "Penguinarium", a penguin exhibit. However, the plan was rejected by Galway City Council. In 2024, it was visited by former NASA astronaut Steven Swanson, and a starfish was named "Steve" in his honor. It has hosted an exhibition in collaboration with University of Galway on using algae for the controlled release of medicine.
