= List of zoos in Germany =

This list of zoos, animal parks, wildlife parks, bird parks and other public zoological establishments in Germany is sorted by location.

City/town	Name	Year of opening	Area (ha)	No. of animals	Species	Web presence	Photo
Aachen	Euregiozoo Animal Park, Aachen	1966	8.9	1200	210	Home page	
Abensberg	Lower Bavarian Bird Park		2.8			Home page	
Abtsdorf	Abtsdorf Wildlife Park						
Ahlen	Ahlen-Langst Animal Enclosure						
Ahorntal	Rabenstein Castle Falconry	1999					
Albstadt-Ebingen	Alb Aquarium	1958				Home page	
Allensbach	Allensbach Wildlife and Leisure Park	1975	75	350		Home page	
Alsdorf	Alsdorfer Weiher Zoo	1967	30	300	30	Home page	
Altenburg	Altenburg Island Zoo	1954	< 1	730	125	Home page	
Altenweddingen	Altenweddingen Zoo						
Altlußheim	Altlußheim Bird Park	1986					
Altreetz	Oderbruch Zoo	1986	2	300	30	Home page	
Amelinghausen	Amelinghausen Owl Garden						
Ammerbuch	Ammerbuch Wildlife Park	1959	20	600	4	Home page	
Angermünde	Angermünde Zoo	1963	7	250	45	Home page	
Angermünde	NABU Information Centre, Blumberger Mühle	1993					
Anklam	Anklam Animal Park						
Annaberg-Buchholz	Wildlife Park am Pöhlberg						
Arnstadt	Zoo Fasanerie	1956					
Aschersleben	Aschersleben Zoo	1973	10	500	120	Home page	
Aue	Zoo der Minis	1960		300	70		
Augsburg	Augsburg Zoo	1937	22	1600	300	Home page	
Augustusburg	Saxon Eagle and Hunting Falconry	1992					
Aulendorf	Aulendorf Wildlife Park						
Aying	Mountain Zoo	2004					
Bad Blankenburg	Greifenstein Castle Falconry	1992					
Bad Driburg	Damhirschgehege Bad Driburg	1954					
Bad Dürrenberg	Kurpark-Gehege Bad Dürrenberg						
Baden-Baden	Wildlife Park am Merkur	1971					
Bad Griesbach	Aviaries in the Kurpark Bad Griesbach						
Bad Harzburg	Bad Harzburg Wildlife Park	1990					
Bad Harzburg	Lynx enclosure at the Rabenklippe	2000					
Bad Herrenalb	Wildlife Park in the Dobeltal						
Bad Kissingen	Klaushof Wildlife Park	1972	30	250	46	Home page	
Bad Kösen	Bad Kösen Zoo	1956					
Bad Köstritz	Bad Köstritz Animal Park	1965					
Bad Liebenstein	Bad Liebenstein Zoo	1996					
Bad Marienberg	Bad Marienberg Wildlife Park		20	100		Home page	
Bad Mergentheim	Bad Mergentheim Wildlife Park	1973	35			Home page	
Bad Nenndorf	The Little Zoo am Krater	1968					
Bad Orb	Spessart Wildlife Park	1937					
Bad Pyrmont	Bad Pyrmont Zoo	1962	3	300	50	Home page	
Bad Saarow	Bad Saarow Pheasant and Wildlife Park	1991					
Bad Sachsa	Harzfalkenhof Bad Sachsa	1965					
Bad Säckingen	Wildlife Park in the Schöpfebachtal						
Bad Salzuflen	Animal Park in the Bad Salzuflen Kurpark						
Bad Schandau	Ostrauer Scheibe Schaustellung						
Bad Schönborn	Bad Schönborn KleinZoo						
Bad Soden-Salmünster	Bad Soden Wildlife Park						
Bad Waldsee	Tannenbühl Wildlife Park						
Bad Wiessee	Bad Wiessee Aquadom	2005					
Bad Windsheim	Franconian Open Air Museum						
Bad Wünnenberg	Bad Wünnenberg Wildlife Park						
Bad Wurzach	Bad Wurzbach Alpaca Farm	1992					
Balingen	Plettenberghof Zoo						
Balje	Niederelbe Natureum	1990					
Baruth-Klasdorf	Johannismühle Wildlife Park	1997					
Bassum	Petermoor Zoo	1967				Home page	
Bayreuth	Röhrensee Zoo	1973					
Bebra	Elferstaler Teiche Wildlife Park						
Beckum	Beckum Wildlife Park	1965					
Beilstein	Hohenbeilstein Castle Falconry	1965					
Bell	Leisure Park / Zilles Zoo						
Bendorf	Garden of live butterflies in Sayn Castle	1987					
Bensheim	Bensheim Bird Park	1979					
Berchtesgaden	Eagle Enclosure at Obersalzberg	1953					
Berlin	Berlin Aquarium	1913				Home page	
Berlin	Tierpark Berlin	1955	160	7500	950	Home page	
Berlin	Berlin Zoological Garden	1844	35	15126	1462	Home page	
Berlin	Manfred Kranzin School Zoo	1993		840	145	Home page	
Berlin	House of Nature and the Environment in the FEZ Wuhlheide	1955					
Berlin	Wildlife Park in Spandau Forest |						
Berlin	Wildlife Park in the Rehberge Volkspark|						
Berlin	Wildlife Park in Tegel Forest	1985					
Berlin	Bat Cellar on the Zitadelle						
Berlin	Domäne Dahlem Farm						
Berlin	Alt-Marzahn Animal Farm	1997					
Berlin	Aviaries in the Neues Kranzler-Eck						
Berlin	Sea Life Centre Berlin and AquaDom	2003					
Berlin	Berliner Bärenzwinger	1939					
Bernbeuren	Wildlife Park am Auerberg						
Bernburg	Bernburg Zoo	1909	8.5	1350	135	Home page	
Bernried	Buchet Deer Park						
Bernsdorf	Animal park						
Bescheid	Bescheider Mühlen-Forellenhof Wildlife Park						
Biebesheim	Biebesheim Bird Park	1973	2			Home page	
Bielefeld	Olderdissen Heimat-Zoo	1930	15	430	100	Home page	
Bietigheim-Bissingen	Aviaries and Animal Park in the Stadtgarten	1989					
Birkenfeld	Birkenfeld Zoo						
Birkenheide	Birkenheide Zoo	1964					
Birkholz	Gut Hirschaue Wildlife Park	1992					
Bischofswerda	Bischofswerda Zoo	1957	0.75	450	80	Home page	
Bispingen	Bird of Prey Enclosure	1978					
Blankenburg (Harz)	Regenstein Castle Falconry	2001					
Bleckede	Aquarium in the Elbtal-Scheune						
Bobenheim-Roxheim	Bobenheim-Roxheim Bird Park	1972					
Bochum	Bochum Zoo and Fossilium	1933	1.9	3300	370	Home page	
Bochum	Vogelgehege in the Stadtgarten Wattenscheid	1954					
Braunfels	Braunfels Wildlife Park Zoo						
Braunschweig	Show Aquarium at the Natural History Museum						
Braunschweig	Noah’s Ark Zoo, Brunswick	1964		300	50	Home page	
Bremen	Zoo In Burgerpark						
Bremerhaven	Zoo am Meer	2004	1.1	280	47	Home page	
Burg Stargard	Klüschenberg Zoo						
Chemnitz	Chemnitz Zoo	1964	10	1000	186	Home page	
Cleebronn	Erlebnispark Tripsdrill	1957	47	130		Home page	
Cleebronn	Stromberg Wildlife Paradise						
Coburg	Coburg-Neuses Sea-Star-Aquarium	2001					
Cologne	Cologne Zoological Garden	1860	20	8000	690	Home page	
Cottbus	Cottbus Zoo	1954		1200	170	Home page	
Cuxhaven	Zoo in Kurpark						
Darmstadt	Darmstadt Vivarium	1965	4	700	150	Home page	
Daun	Daun Wildlife and Experience Park					Home page	
Delbrück	Nadermann Zoo	1967	8	600	100		
Delitzsch	Delitzsch Zoo	1968	5	300	80	Home page	
Dessau	Dessau Zoo	1958	11	500	120	Home page	
Detmold	Berlebeck Eagle Observatory	1939		200	40	Home page	
Detmold	Detmold Bird Park and Gardens, Heiligenkirchen						
Dormagen	Tannenbusch Wildlife Park	1960	20	200	25	Home page	
Dortmund	Dortmund Zoo	1953	28	1840	265	Home page	
Dresden	Dresden Zoo	1861	13	3000	400	Home page	
Duisburg	Duisburg Zoo	1934	15.5	2130	280	Home page	
Düsseldorf	Aquazoo Löbbecke Museum	1904	0.7	5000	560	Home page	
Düsseldorf	Grafenberg Wildlife Park	1927	40	100		Home page	
Eberswalde	Eberswalde Zoo	1928	20	1400	140	Home page	
Edertal	Edersee Wildlife Park	1970	80			wildpark.html Home page	
Eichert Heidenheim	Eichert Heidenheim Wildlife Park						
Eilenburg	Eilenburg Zoo	1959	4	260	45	Home page	
Eisenberg	Eisenberg Zoo	1971	2.5	400	60	Home page	
Erfurt	Thuringian Zoo	1959	63	3000	560	Home page	
Essen	Pet Zoo in the Grugapark	1995				Home page	
Essen	Heissiwald Wildlife Park						
Falkenstein/Vogtl.	Falkenstein Zoo	1953	1.8	77	39	Home page	
Frankfurt	Frankfurt Zoological Garden	1858	11	4800	565	Home page	
Freiburg im Breisgau	Mundenhof Animal Park	1968		180	30		
Freisen	Freisen Nature Wildlife Park						
Friedrichskoog	Friedrichskoog Seal Station	1985				Home page	
Friedrichsruh	Butterfly Garden	1985				Home page	
Friesoythe	Thüle Zoo and Leisure Park		8.5		120	Home page	
Fulda	HeimatZoo Fulda-Neuenberg						
Fulda	Aquarien & Terrarienverein						
Fürstenwalde	Fürstenwalde HeimatZoo						
Fürth	Fürth-Erlenbach Mountain Zoo						
Finsterwalde	Finsterwalde Zoo						
Gangelt	Gangelt Wildlife Park						
Gelsenkirchen	ZOOM Erlebniswelt Gelsenkirchen	1949	31	560	65	Home page	
Gera	Gera Zoo	1962	20	500	80	Home page	
Gerolstein	Gerolstein Eagle and Wolf Park						
Gersbach	Gersbach Park in the South Black Forest Nature Park						
Gersfeld	Gersfeld Wildlife Park	1972	50	150	25	Home page	
Gettorf	Gettorf Zoo	1968	8	850	150	Home page	
Gladbeck	Wittringen Castle						
Gondorf	Eifel Park	1964	75			Home page	
Göppingen	Göppingen Zoo						
Görlitz	Görlitz Zoo	1957	5	500	140	Home page	
Gotha	Gotha Zoo		6	680	140	Home page	
Grevenbroich	Wildfreigehege Bend	1975	7	200	10	Home page	
Gronau	Gronau Zoo						
Groß-Schönebeck	Schorfheide Wildlife Park						
Großenaspe	Eekholt Wildlife Park	1970	67	700	100	Home page	
Groß-Gerau	Fasanerie Groß-Gerau						
Güstrow	Natur- and Umweltpark Güstrow	1959	200			Home page	
Halberstadt	Zoo Halberstadt	1960	10	400	90	Home page	
Halle	Halle Zoo	1901	9	194	96	Home page	
Hamburg	Hagenbeck Zoo	1907	25	1850	210	Home page	
Hamburg	Hagenbeck Tropical Aquarium	2007	0.8	14300		Home page	
Hamburg	Schwarze Berge Wildlife Park	1969	50	1000		Home page	
Hamm	Hamm Zoo	1933	6.5	720	108	Home page	
Hanau	Alte Fasanerie Wildlife Park	1967	107	350	40	Home page	
Hankensbüttel	Hankensbüttel Otter Centre	1988	6			Home page	
Hanover	Hanover Zoo (Zoo Hannover)	1865	22	1813	223	Home page	
Hanover	Hanover Animal Park (Tiergarten Hannover)		112				
Hanstedt	Lüneburg Heath Wildlife Park	1970	61	1000	120	Home page	
Heidelberg	Heidelberg Zoo	1934	10.2	980	162	Home page	
Helgoland	Helgoland Aquarium						
Hellenthal	Hellenthal Wildlife Park	1967	65			Home page	
Herborn	Herborn Bird Park				100	Home page	
Herford	Herford School Zoo						
Herford	Herford Zoo	1952	3	400	40		
Hirschfeld, Saxony	Hirschfeld Wildlife Park	1954	6	600	90		
Hodenhagen	Serengeti Park	1974	200			Home page	
Hof	Hof Zoo	1954				Home page	
Hofgeismar	Sababurg Zoo	1973	130			Home page	
Hoyerswerda	Hoyerswerda Zoo						
Herzberg (Elster)	Herzberg (Elster) Zoo						
Ilmenau	Animal Park am Großen Teich						
Ingolstadt	Animal Park am Baggersee						
Ingolstadt	Wasserstern Kleinzoo						
Irgenöd	Irgenöd Bird Park					Home page	
Isselburg	Anholter Schweiz BiotopWildlife Park					Home page	
Jaderberg	Jaderpark	1950	17	600	130	Home page	
Kaiserslautern	Kaiserslautern Zoo	1968	7	220	55	Home page	
Kalletal	Kalletal Zoo	1969		100	20	Home page	
Karlsruhe	Karlsruhe Zoo	1865	18	800	150	Home page	
Kevelaer	Niederrheinpark Plantaria						
Kiel	Kiel Aquarium					Home page	
Kiel	Projensdorfer Gehölz					website	
Kirchhundem	Panorama-Park Sauerland Wildlife Park					Home page	
Kleve	Kleve Zoo						
Konstanz	Sea Life Centre Konstanz						
Köthen	Köthen Zoo	1872	4	130	600	Home page	
Krefeld	Krefeld Zoo	1938	13	1300	225	Home page	
Kronberg im Taunus	Opel Zoo	1956		1400	200	Home page	
Landau	Zoo Landau					Home page	
Landau	Landau in der Pfalz Reptilium					Home page	
Lauenbrück	Lauenbrück LandPark	1969	22	200		Home page	
Lavesum	Ketteler Hof	1969	11.5			Home page	
Lehre	Essehof Zoo	1968	10	260	50	Home page	
Lelkendorf	Lelkendorf Haus Zoo						
Leipzig	Leipzig Zoo	1878	26	8077	840	Home page	
Leipzig	Leipzig Wildlife Park	1902	42	250	30	Home page	
Leverkusen	Reuschenberg Wildlife Park	1976				Home page	
Limbach-Oberfrohna	Limbach-Oberfrohna Zoo						
Löffingen	Löffingen Black Forest Park						
Lohberg	Bavarian Forest Zoo						
Lorsch	Lorsch Bird Park						
Lübeck	Zoo (Lübeck)	1950, 2010 closed	2.8				
Lünebach	Eifel-Zoo	1972	30	400	60	Home page	
Magdeburg	Magdeburg Zoo	1950		608	135	Home page	
Mannheim	Mannheim Luisenpark						
Marlow	Marlow Bird Park	1994	22			Home page	
Merzig	Merzig Wolf Enclosure						
Metelen	Metelen Aventure Zoo						
Michelstadt	English Garden Wildlife Park, Eulbach						
Mönchengladbach	Mönchengladbach Zoo	1957	4.3	500	125	Home page	
Moritzburg	Moritzburg Wildlife Park						
Munich	Hellabrunn Zoo	1911	36	14800	665	Home page	
Munich	Sea Life Centre Munich	2006	0.2	10000	150	Home page	
Münster	Münster Allwetter Zoo	1974	30	3088		Home page	
Müritz	Müritz Bear Forest						
Neumarkt in der Oberpfalz	Jura Zoo	1989	0.7	2270	60	Home page	
Neumünster	Neumünster Zoo	1951	24	700	170	Home page	
Neunkirchen	Neunkirchen Zoo	1924	12	650	140	Home page	
Neuruppin	Kunsterspring Zoo						
Neustrelitz	Neustrelitz Zoo	1956	48			Home page	
Neuwied	Neuwied Zoo	1970	13.5	1200	155	Home page	
Niendorf (Ostsee)	Niendorf Bird Park	1973	7	1300	350	Home page	
Nordhorn	Nordhorn Zoo	1950	10	1000	90	Home page	
Nuremberg	Nuremberg Zoo	1912	70	4045	252	Home page	
Oberhausen	Animal Park in the Kaisergarten						
Oberhof	Oberhof Exotarium	2000	0.1			Home page	
Olching	Olching Bird Park		20			Home page	
Ortenburg	Ortenburg Wildlife Park					Home page	
Osnabrück	Osnabrück Zoo	1936	23.5	2277	300	Home page	
Osterholz-Scharmbeck	Ludwigslust Zoo						
Perleberg	Perleberg Zoo						
Pforzheim	Pforzheim Wildlife Park	1968	16.5	400	70	Home page	
Pfungstadt	Pfungstadt Zoo	1965 (2004)	0.4	230	43	Home page	
Pitzling (Lech)	Landsberg am Lech Wildlife Park						
Poing	Poing Wildlife Park		57			Home page	
Regensburg	Regensburg Reptile Zoo						
Reichshof	Reichshof-Eckenhagen Monkey and Bird Park	1972					
Reken	Frankenhof Wildlife Park						
Rheinberg	Rheinberg TerraZoo	1996		200	70	Home page	
Rheinböllen	Hochwildschutzpark Hunsrück	1967	70	300	40	Home page	
Rheine	Rheine Nature Zoo	1937	13	1010	93	Home page	
Riesa	Riesa Heimat Zoo						
Rostock	Rostock Zoo	1899	56	1758	231	Home page	
Rotfelden	Rotfelden Camel Farm	2002		94		Home page	
Saarbrücken	Saarbrücken Zoo	1932	15	1000	160	Home page	
Salem	Salem Monkey Hill	1969	20	200		Home page	
Sankt Peter-Ording	West Coast Park						
Sassnitz	Sassnitz Wildlife Park	1963	2.7	250	60	Home page	
Schönebeck	HeimatZoo Schönebeck (Elbe)						
Schwaigern	Schwaigern Leintal Zoo	1980		270	50	Home page	
Schweinfurt	Wildlife Park an den Eichen						
Schwerin	Schwerin Zoo	1956	25			Home page	
Silz	Southern Wine Road Wildlife and Walking Park		100	500	15	Home page	
Solingen	Zoo Fauna						
Solingen	Solingen Bird Park and Zoo						
Sommerhausen	Sommerhausen Wildlife Park						
Sonneberg	HeimatZoo Sonneberg/Neufang						
Springe	Springe Bison Park	1928		400		Home page	
Staßfurt	Staßfurt Zoo						
Steinen	Steinen Bird Park	1980	10	1000	300	Home page	
Stendal	Stendal Zoo		6	460	75		
Stralsund	Stralsund Zoo		16			Home page	
Stralsund	German Sealife Museum	1951				Home page	
Straubing	Straubing Zoo	1938		1000	200	Home page	
Stuttgart	Wilhelma	1951	30	11500	1200	Home page	
Suhl	Suhl Zoo						
Thale	Hexentanzplatz Zoo						
Thum	Thum Zoo						
Timmendorfer Strand	Sea Life Centre Timmendorfer Strand						
Überlingen	Reutemühle Pet Farm	1994			180	Home page	
Ueckermünde	Ueckermünde Zoo	1962	18	400	100	Home page	
Ulm	Ulm Zoo	1935				Home page	
Verden	Wolfspark						
Viernheim	Viernheim Bird Park						
Voßwinkel	Voßwinkel Deer Wood	1970	600			Home page	
Wachenheim	Kurpfalz Park						
Wagenfeld	Ströhen Zoo	1959	30	600		Home page	
Walsrode	Walsrode Bird Park						
Warder	Arche Warder Zoo						
Weilburg	Weilburg Wildlife Park Zoo						
Weißenfels	Weißenfels Gardens						
Weißwasser	Weißwasser Zoo						
Weitramsdorf	Tambach Castle Wildlife Park						
Wernigerode	Christianental Wildlife Park	1974		45		https://web.archive.org/web/20170622052530/http://www.christianental-wernigerode.de/Wildpark/	
Westerland	Sylt Aquarium						
Wiesbaden	Fasanerie Zoo and Gardens						
Willingen	Wildlife and Leisure Park Willingen						
Wingst	Zoo in the Wingst						
Wismar	Wismar Zoo						
Wolgast	Wolgast Zoo						
Worbis	Worbis Alternative Bear Park						
Worms	Worms Zoo						
Wuppertal	Wuppertal Zoo	1881	24	5000	500	Home page	
Zabakuck	Zabakuck Zoo						
Zeithain	Jacobsthal Wildlife Park	1992					
Zell im Wiesental	Zell im Wiesental Wildlife Park	1971					
Zella-Mehlis	Zella-Mehlis Sealife Aquarium	1994					
Zeulenroda	Zeulenroda Wildlife Park	1967					
Zittau	Zittau Zoo	1965	7	380	70	Home page	
Zuzenhausen	Felshang Bird Park	1987					
Zwickau	Enclosure am Schwanenteich						

== See also ==
- List of zoos

== Sources ==
- Rolf Stelly (ed.): Ein Zoowegweiser zu westdeutschen Tiergärten Wild u. Vogelparks Aquarienschauen usw, Hamburg o.J. (ca. 1963).
- Karl Lemke: Tiergärten: Zoos, Aquarien, Wildgehege (Tourist Guide), Berlin / Leipzig 1985.
- Heinrich Dathe (ed.): Tiergärten der Deutschen Demokratischen Republik, Berlin 1987.
- Dirk Petzold, Silke Sorge (eds.): Abenteuer Zoo. 550 Zoos, Aquarien und Reptilienhäuser. Der Zooführer für Deutschland, Österreich und die Schweiz, Graz 2007.
