= Dessau Zoo =

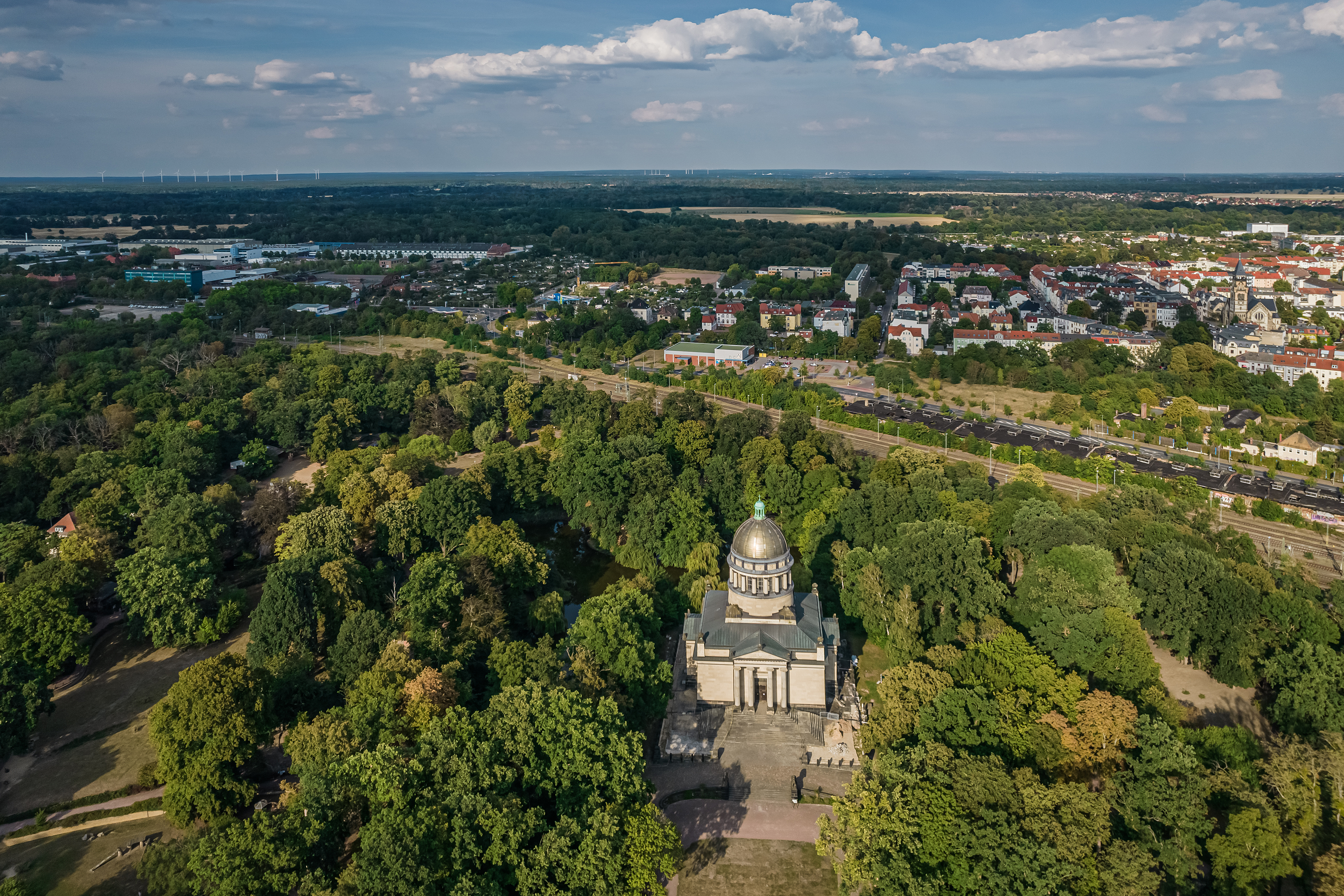
- Aerial view
- Interactive map of Dessau Zoo
- 51°50′44″N 12°14′08″E
- Date opened: 1958
- Location: Dessau, Saxony-Anhalt, Germany
- Land area: 11 hectares (27.2 acres)
- No. of animals: 500
- No. of species: 120
- Annual visitors: 100.000
- Memberships: DTG
- Owner: Town Dessau-Roßlau
- Website: www.tierpark.dessau.de

The Dessau Zoo (German: Tierpark Dessau) is a municipally owned zoo in Dessau-Roßlau, Germany, established in 1958. It is located in a historic park surrounding the mausoleum of the Dukes of Anhalt.

The zoo is home to about 500 animals representing approximately 120 species and receives around 100,000 visitors annually.

Most of the animals are of European origin, including wolves, goats, and donkeys, while the zoo also exhibits exotic species such as kangaroos, llamas, and jaguars.

The zoo's terrarium formerly housed Otto, a reticulated python that was described as Europe's oldest and measured approximately 6.8 meters in length. Otto died in 2018 after living at the zoo since 1979.

== See also ==
- Dessau-Wörlitz Garden Realm
- List of zoos in Germany
