= Chemnitz Zoo =

Tierpark Chemnitz
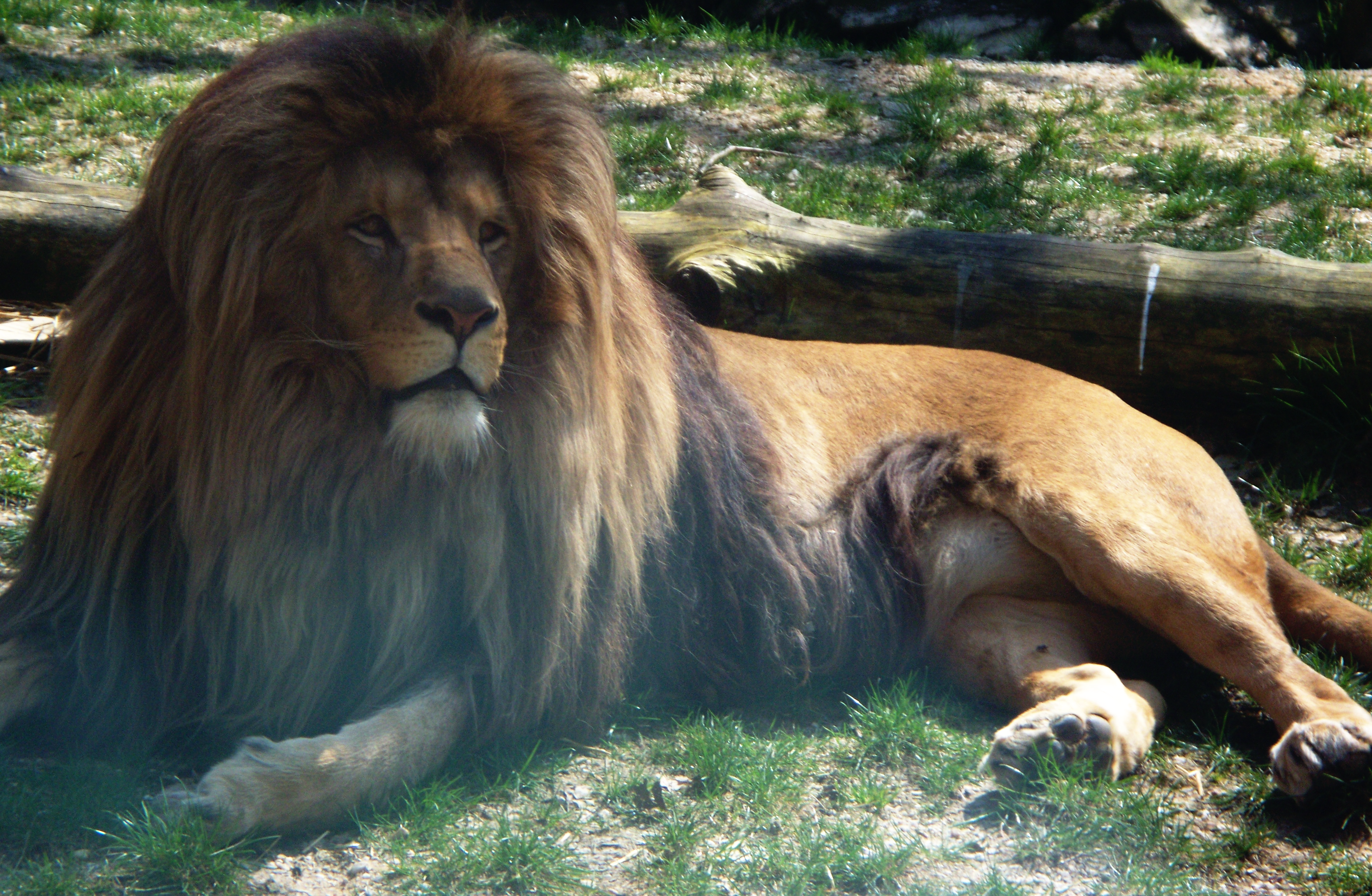
- The famous lion Malik
- 50°49′6″N 12°50′6″E
- Date opened: 1964
- Location: Nevoigtstraße 18; 09117 Chemnitz, Germany
- Land area: 10 hectares (24.7 acres)
- No. of animals: ca. 1000 (2014)
- No. of species: ca. 200 Species (2014)
- Annual visitors: 141.677 (2014)
- Memberships: EAZA, WAZA
- Director: Anja Dube
- Website: www.tierpark-chemnitz.de

The Chemnitz Zoo (German: Tierpark Chemnitz) is a zoo in the city Chemnitz in Sachsen, Germany.

The Zoo was opened in 1964, and has a thousand animals from two hundred species, living on 10 hectares (24.7 acres). During the first decades, most species reflected the nature of the Soviet Union, and later the zoo moved into breeding endangered species. In 2014, the Zoo had over 178,000 visitors. In 2004, a lion wounded a female zookeeper, and in 2006 another female zookeeper was killed by a leopard. After the female Amur tiger Taiga died in the fall of 2016, the male Jantar lived alone in the tiger enclosure. In December 2017, a second Amur tiger, Wolodja from Nuremberg Zoo, moved into the facility. However, the already 19-year-old Jantar was euthanized just a few weeks later.

== Literature ==
- Anja Dube et al.: 50 Jahre Tierpark Chemnitz. Kommunikation & Design Verlag, Lugau 2014, ISBN 978-3-945434-00-0.

== See also ==
- List of zoos in Germany
