= Eekholt Wildlife Park =

Wildpark Eekholt
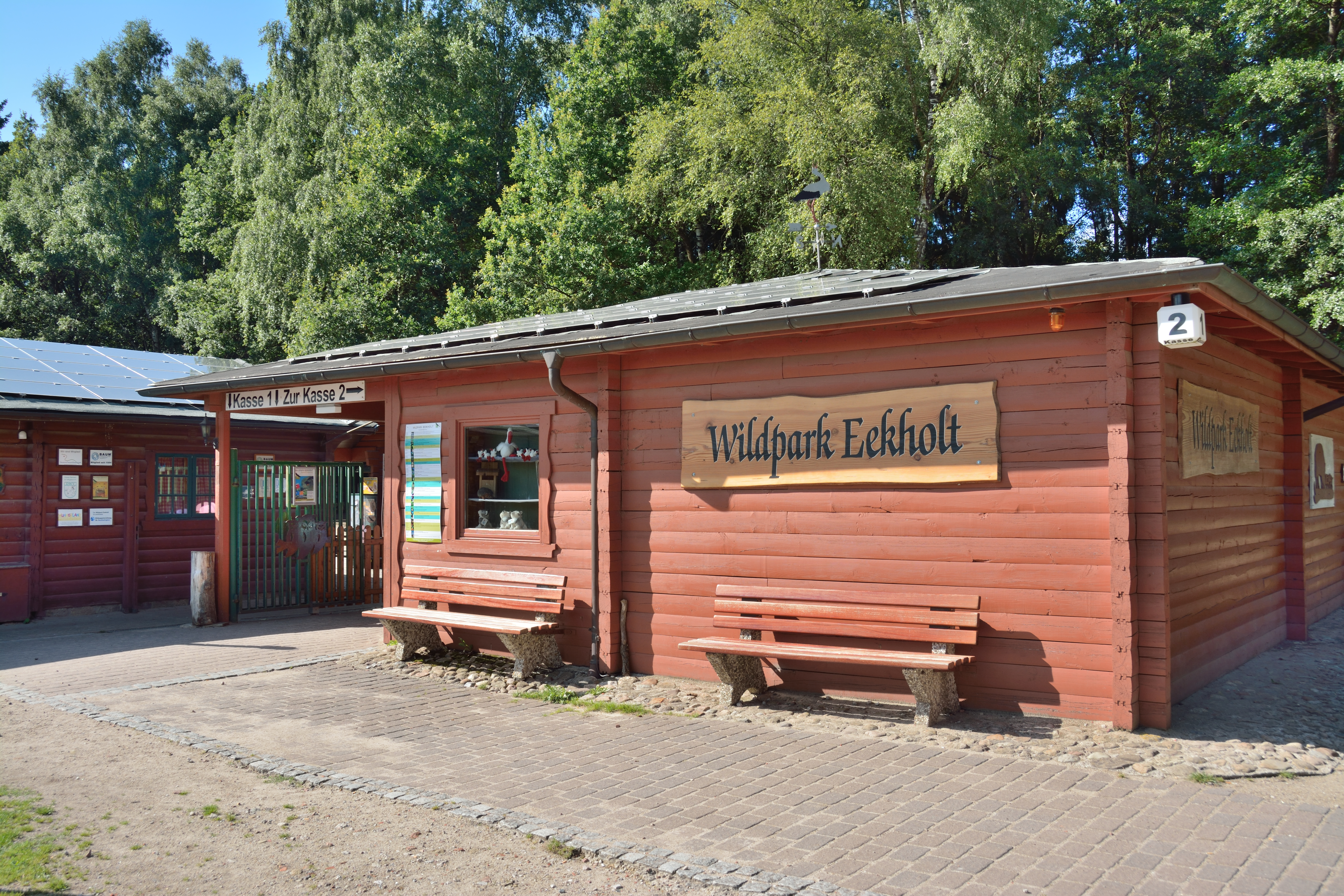
- Zoo entrance 2013
- Interactive map of Wildpark Eekholt
- 53°56′57.18″N 10°1′43.52″E
- Date opened: 1970
- Location: Großenaspe, Germany
- Land area: 0.67 square kilometres (170 acres)
- No. of animals: 700
- No. of species: 100
- Website: Wildpark Eekholt (de)

The Wildpark Eekholt is a wildlife park near Großenaspe (Schleswig-Holstein). It hosts about 100 species in Central Europe with over 700 animals on an area of 67 hectares, which nature has designed.

The zoo was founded in 1970. It is also a place of education for the protection of the environment.
