= Opel Zoo =

Opel-Zoo
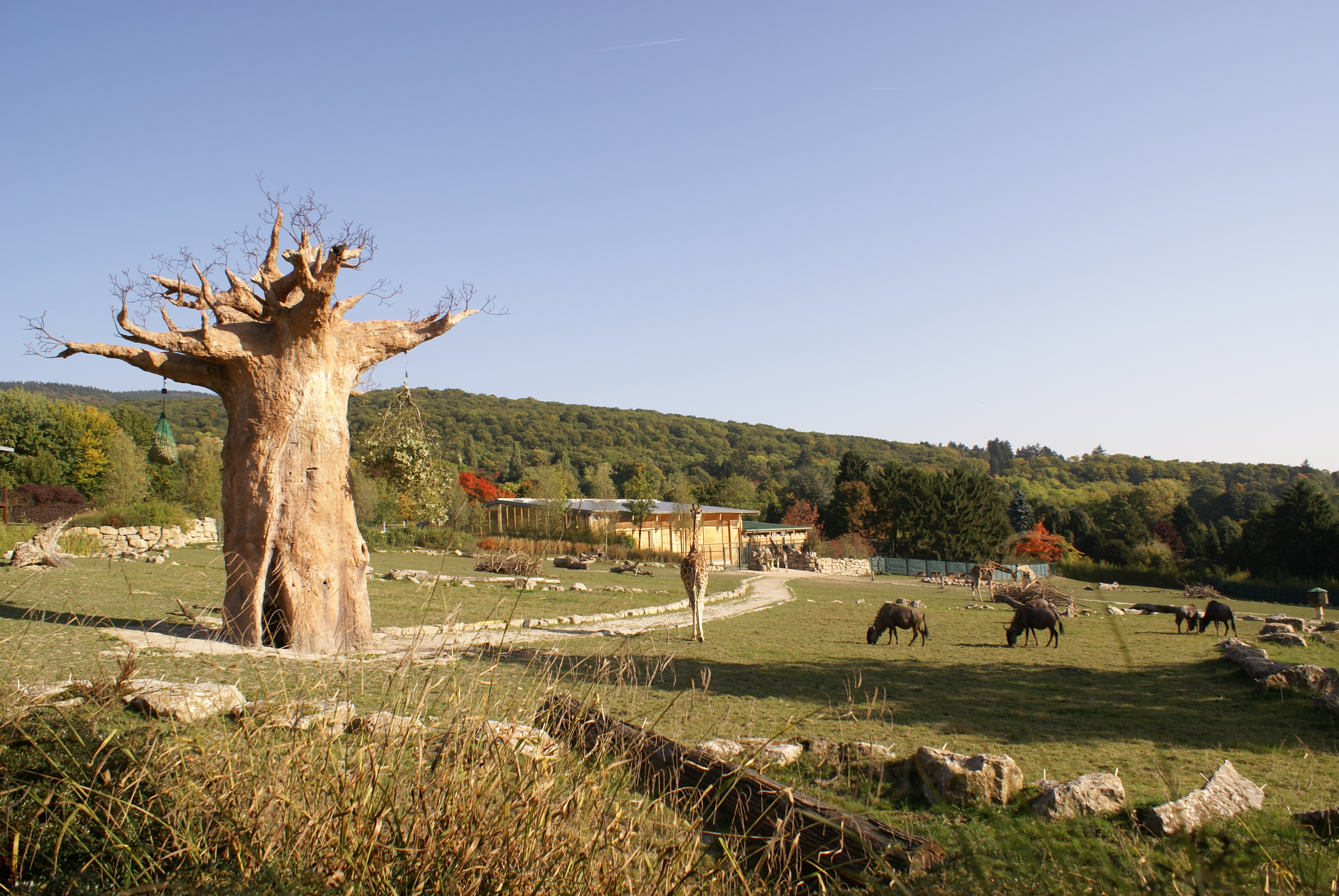
- Africa-Savanna at the entrance
- 50°11′0″N 8°29′11″E
- Date opened: 1956
- Location: Königsteiner Straße 35; 61476 Kronberg im Taunus, Germany
- Land area: 27 hectares (66.7 acres)
- No. of animals: 1631 (2015)
- No. of species: 223 (2015)
- Annual visitors: 748.990 (2014)
- Memberships: EAZA, WAZA
- Owner: von Opel Hessische Zoostiftung
- Director: Thomas Kauffels
- Website: www.opel-zoo.de

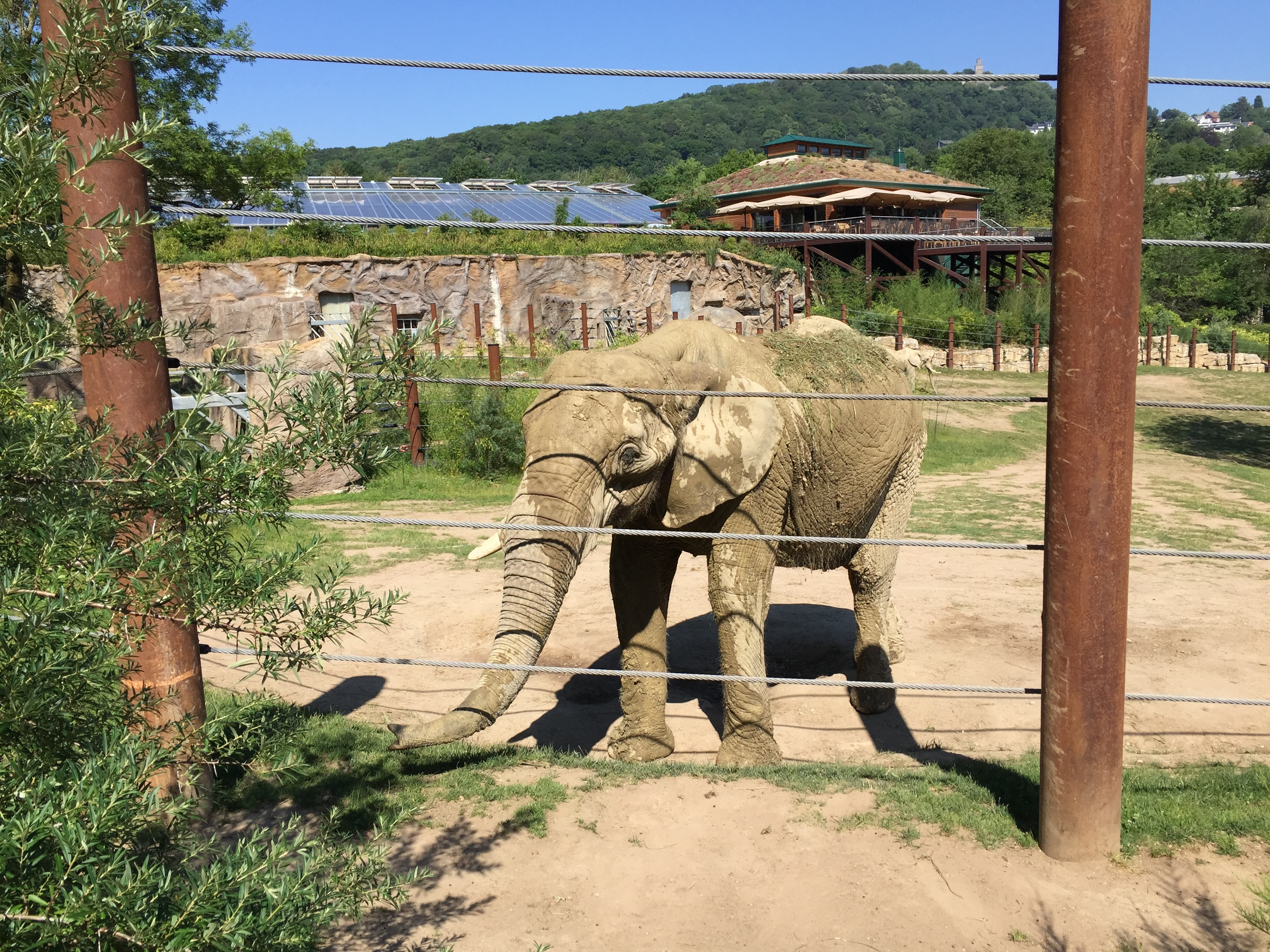
Opel Zoo elephants

The Opel Zoo (German: von Opel Hessische Zoostiftung) is a zoo in Königstein im Taunus, Hesse in Germany.

The Zoo was founded in 1956 by Georg von Opel, and covers 27 hectares (66.7 acres).

1,600 animals from 200 species live in the Zoo, including african elephants.

== Elephants ==
Opel Zoo is the one-of-a-kind Zoo in Hesse which keeps elephants. The first import of African elephants was in 1955. They were two males, Vauka and Conti, and one female, Opeline. Vauka sired two calves with Opeline: Afrika born 1965, and the bull Afrikano 1968. Like all bull elephants, Conti and Vauka became more and more aggressive, and they were euthanized in 1971 and 1977, respectively. The female Aruba, born in 1979 in Zimbabwe, was bought in 1981.

Afrikano died in 1981 due to wounds he got from spike nails in his stable, and Afrika died in 1982, the same year as the female Toto was bought from Munich Zoo. Toto was euthanised in 1992, and Opeline died during the nineties. Since then new elephants were bought, but they have not bred so far.

The new elephant house with a new enclosure was built in 2013,

== See also ==
- List of zoos in Germany
