= Saarbrücken Zoo =

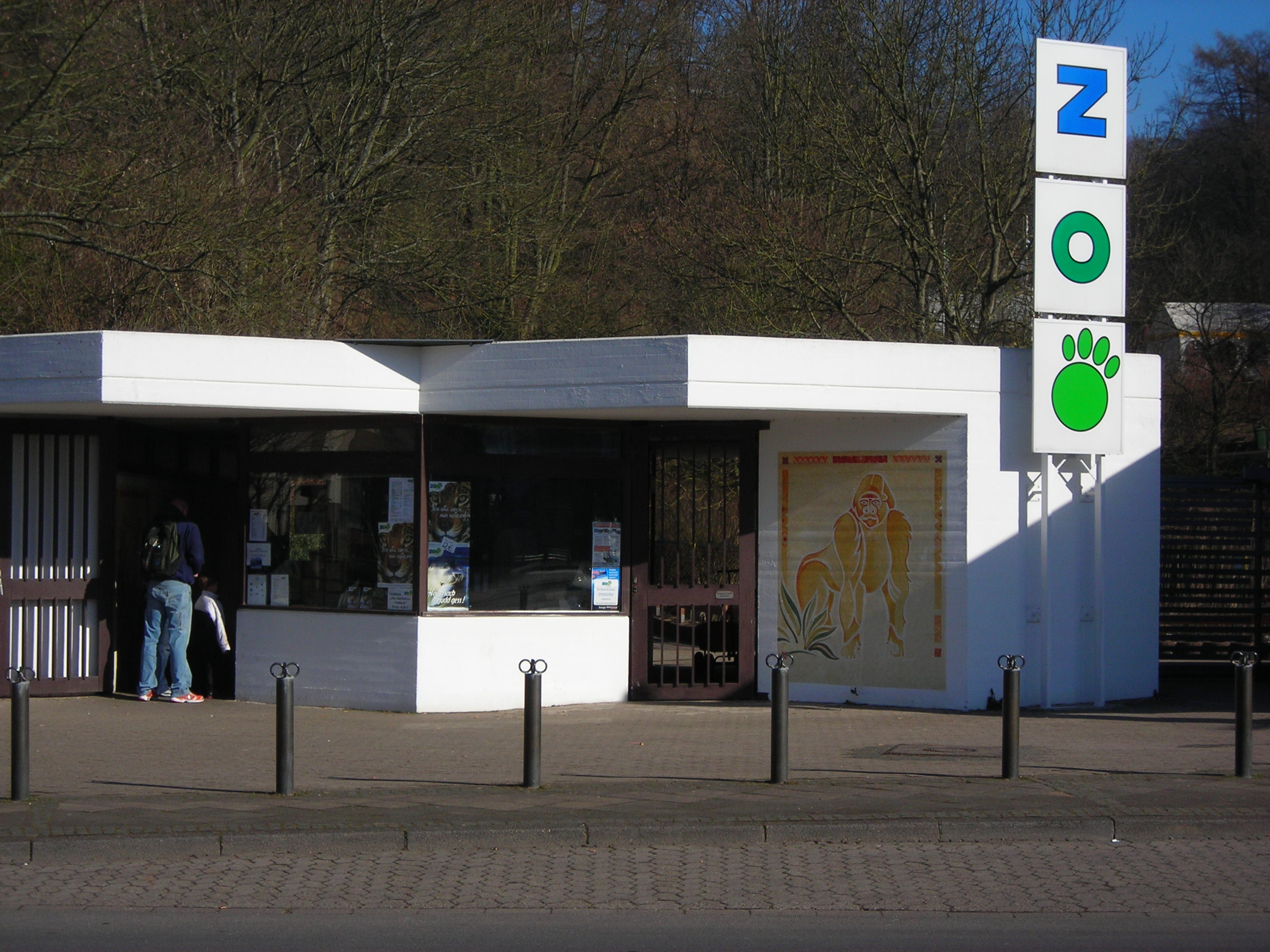
- Main Entrance
- 49°13′50.74″N 7°2′22.49″E
- Slogan: Hallo im Zoo
- Date opened: 1956
- Location: Graf-Stauffenberg-Straße 66121 Saarbrücken, Germany
- Land area: 13 hectares (32.1 acres)
- No. of animals: 1760 Tierarten aus Afrika, Südamerika und Madagaskar
- No. of species: 160 Species
- Annual visitors: 260.000 (2014)
- Memberships: EAZA, WAZA
- Director: Richard Francke
- Website: www.zoo.saarbruecken.de

The Saarbrücken Zoo (German: Zoologischer Garten der Landeshauptstadt Saarbrücken) is with over 200.000 visitors annually, and over 1.700 animals from 160 Species the largest Zoo in Saarland. The Zoo is specialized in African animals.

== History ==
In 1870, the land for the present Zoo was used as a quarry, and until 1926 a funicular. The old Zoo was founded in 1932, but became totally destroyed during World War II. 1956 the work started to rebuild the zoo on a new site, consisting 15 hectares (37.1 acres) on the foot of the hill Eschberges.

In February 1995 the elephant Danka killed the head elephant keeper Uwe Rothe, by headbutting him against a wall, and a year later, in March 2006, both elephants were sold to Alexandria Zoo in Egypt where both elephants died the same day a month later.

During the end of 2005 the north gate closed due to less visitors coming to the zoo, and some northern parts of zoo was redesigned to residential building. The longtime Director Vaclav Ceska was removed from office, and plans were made to renew the popularity among the public of Saarbrücken.

Since 2008 a lot of improvements have been made, including renewing of enclosures and contact with financing sponsors.

== Pictures ==
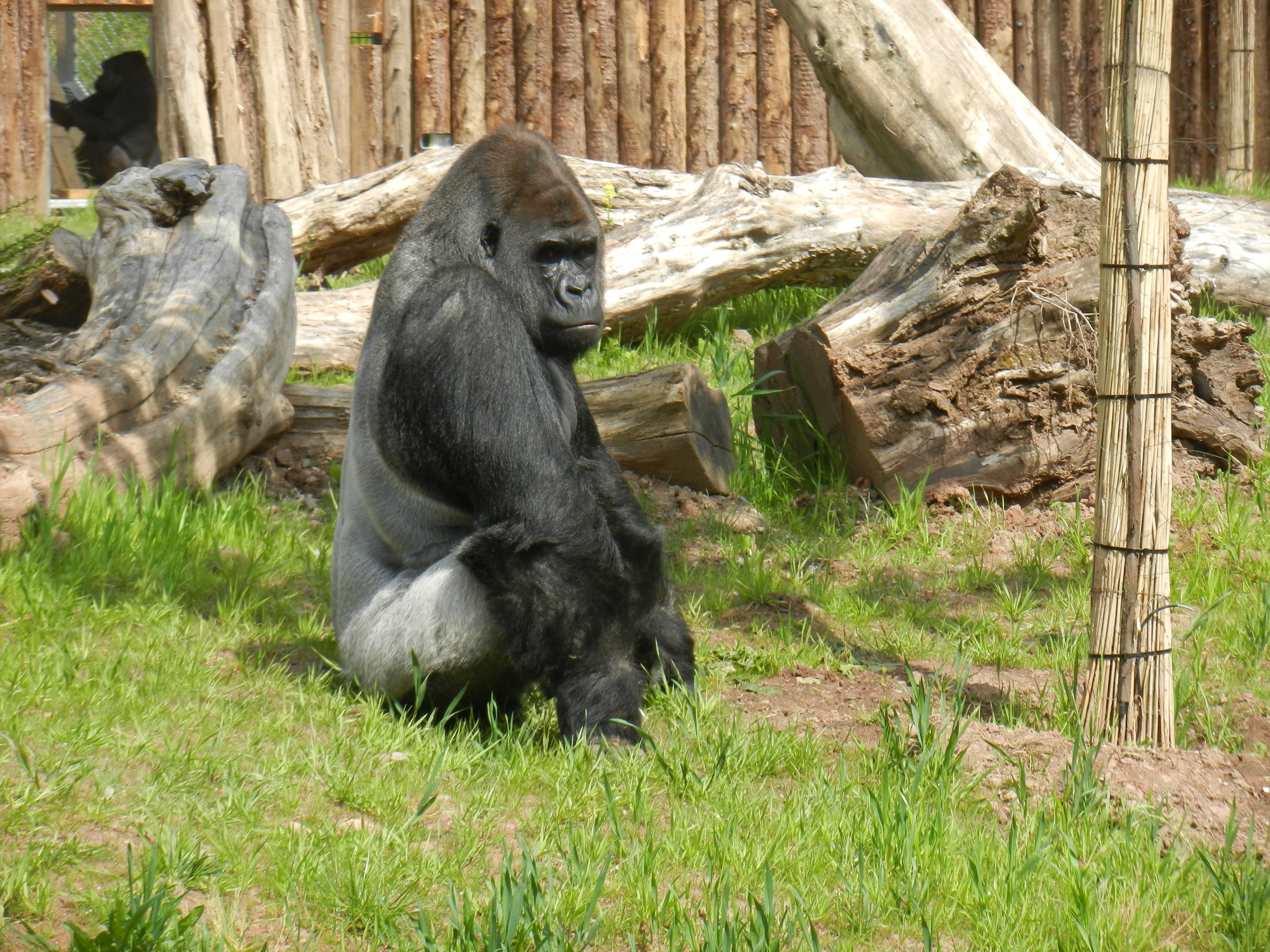

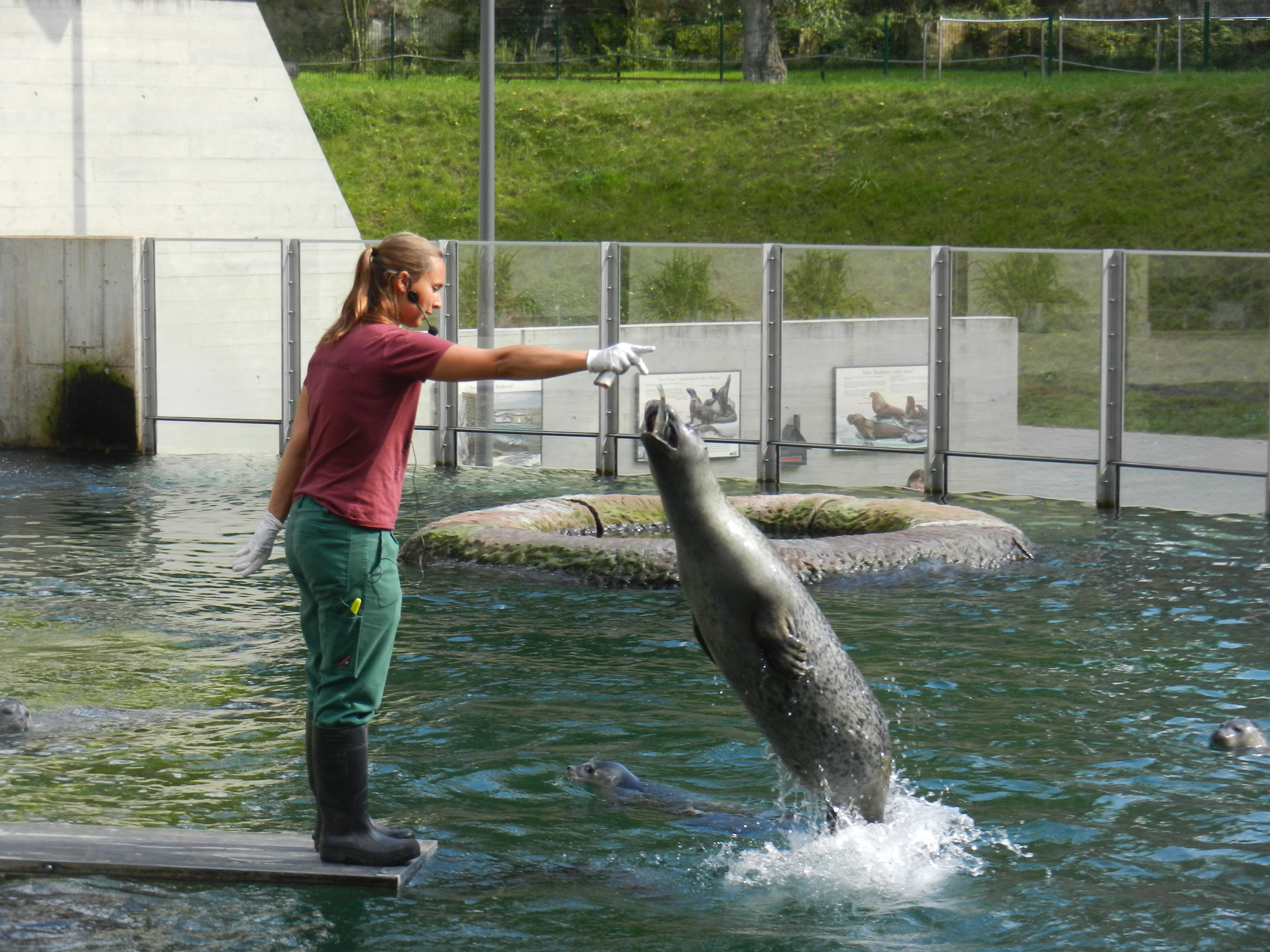

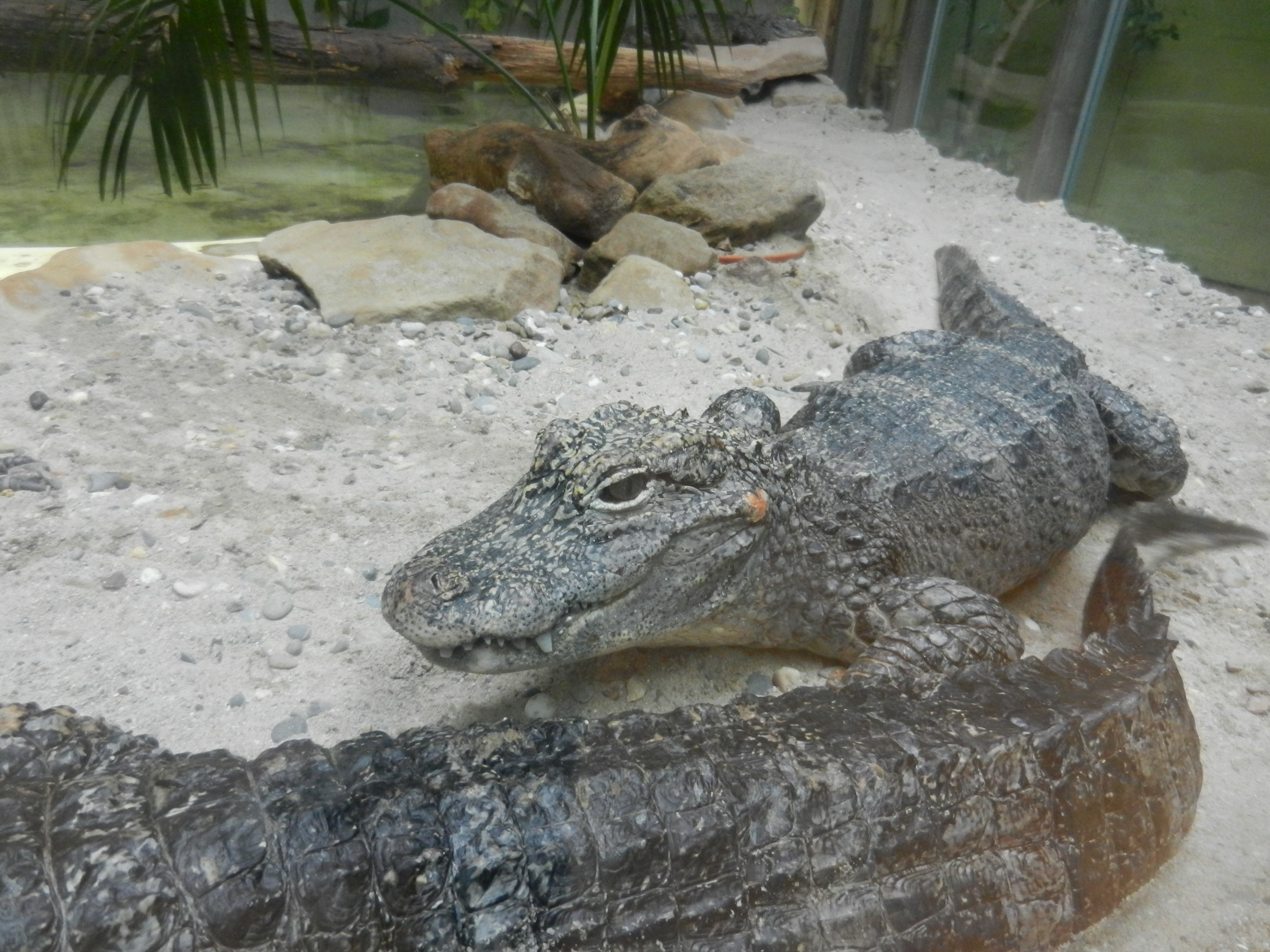

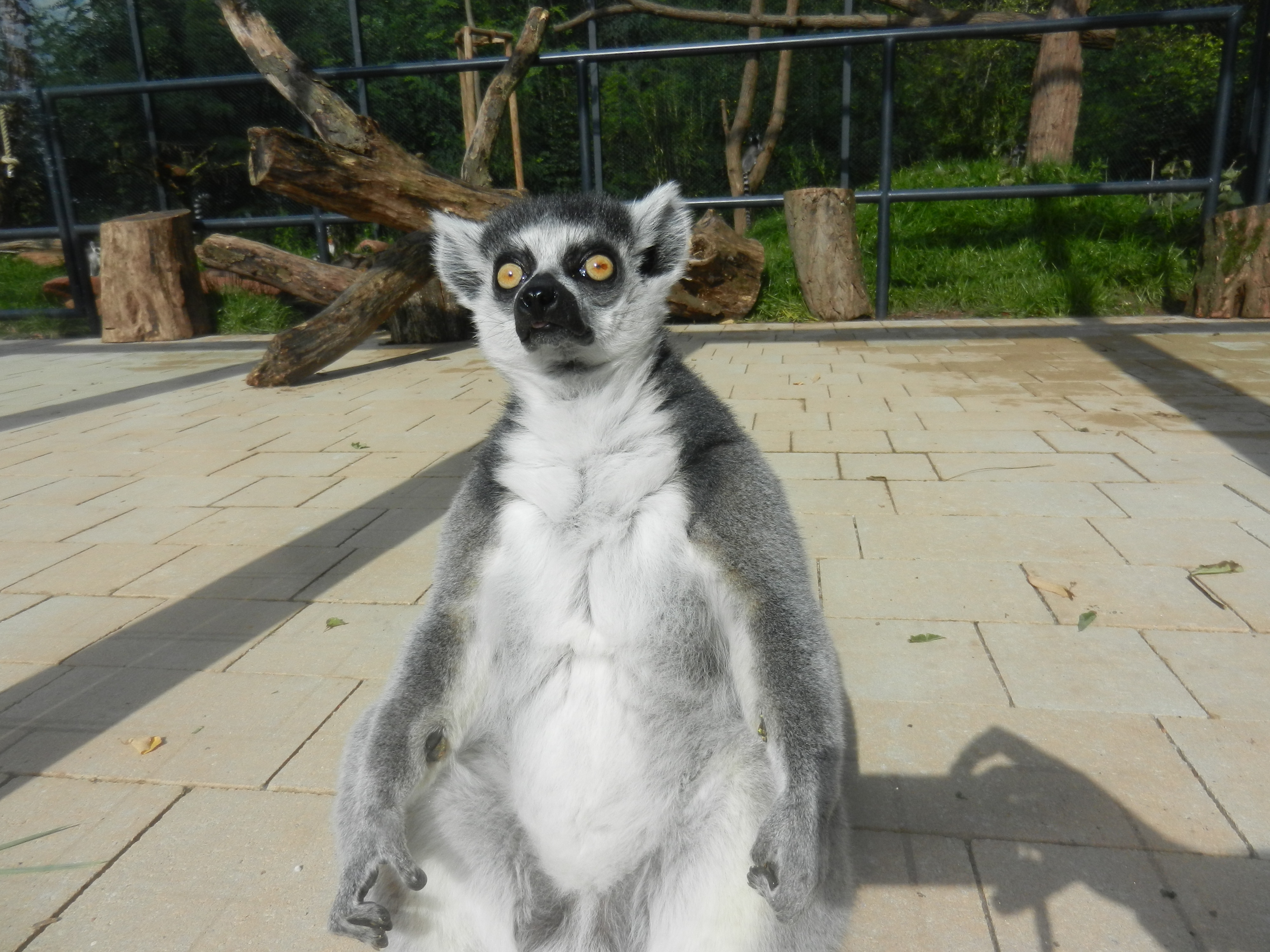

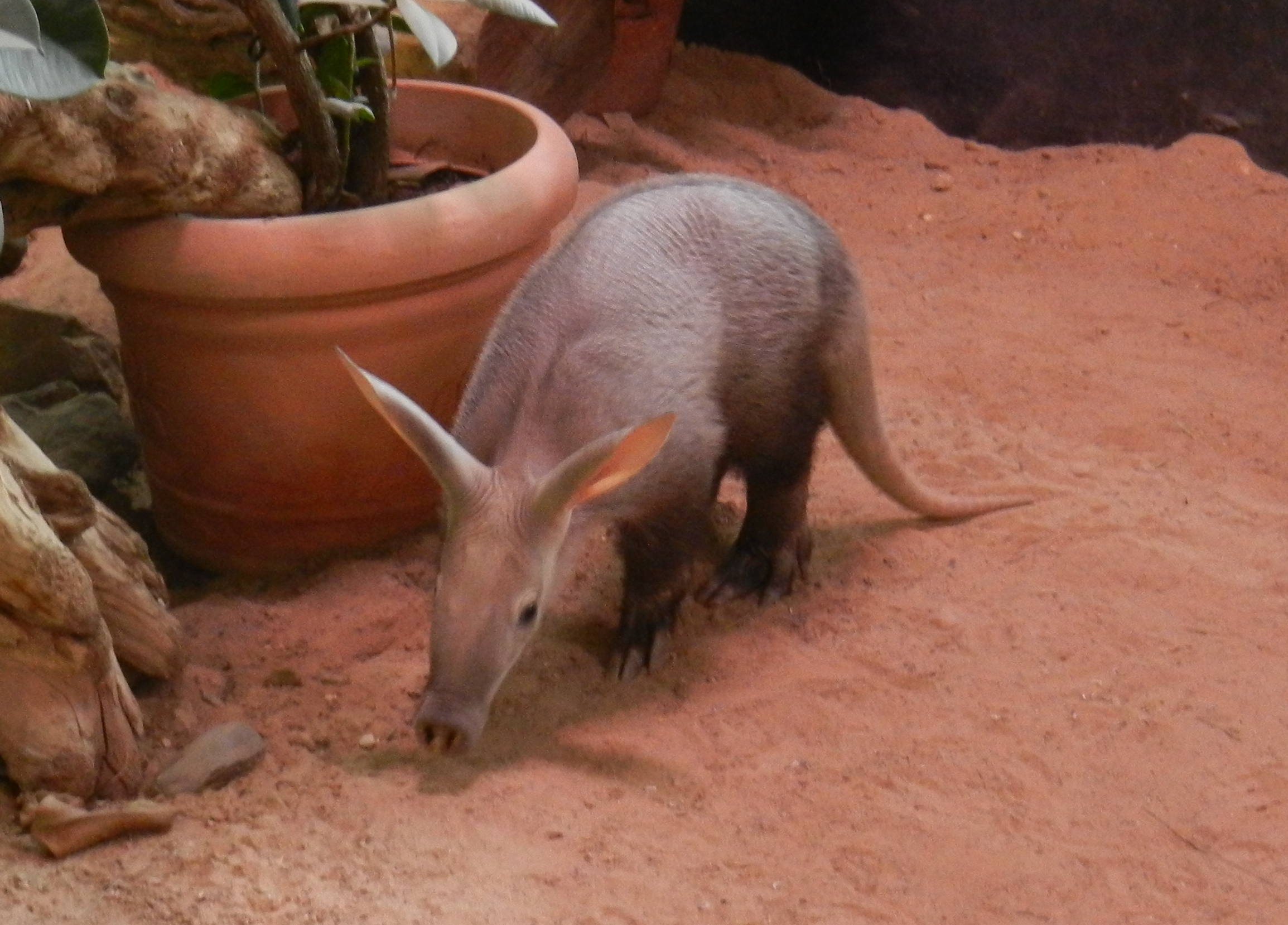

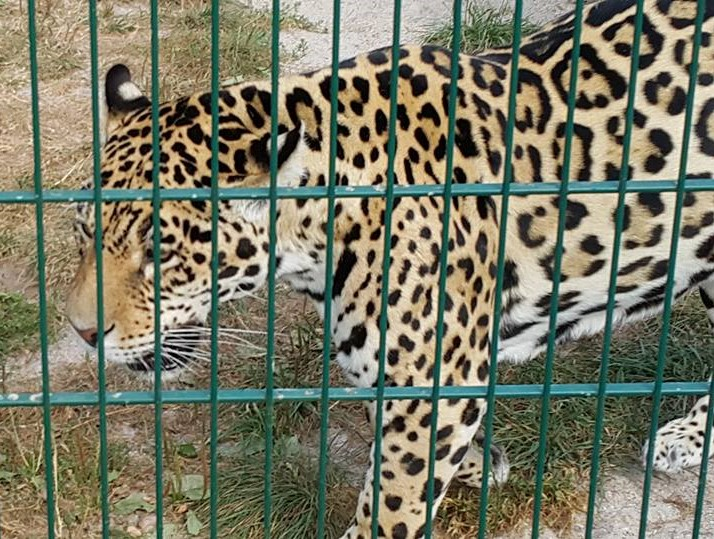

== Literature ==
- Eugen Grittmann: 80 Jahre Saarbrücker Zoo. 1932–2012. Hrsg.: Zoologischer Garten Saarbrücken. Saarbrücken 2012.

== See also ==
- List of zoos in Germany
