= Görlitz Zoo =

Zoo in Görlitz, Saxony

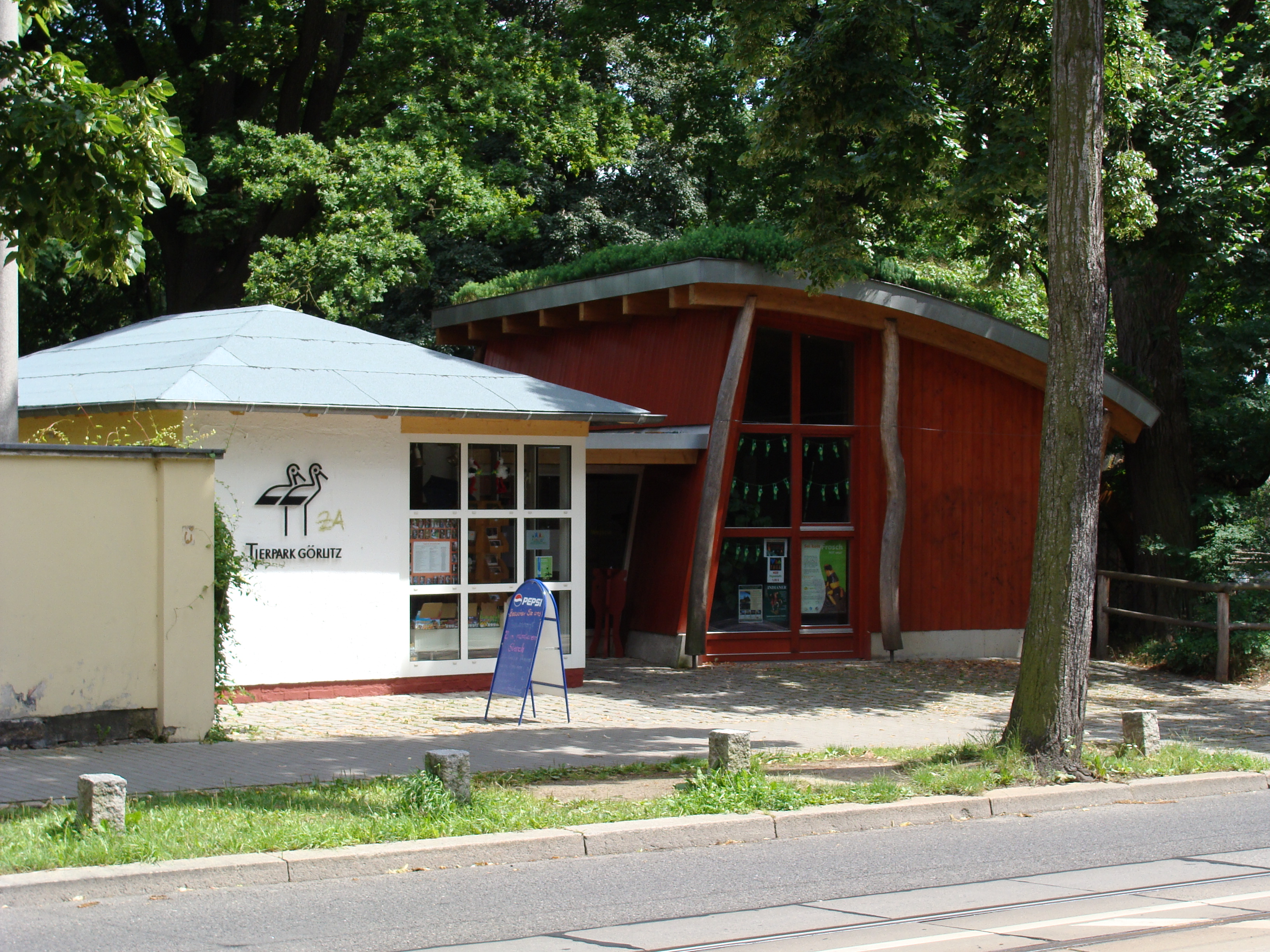
- Eingang Tierpark
- Interactive map of Görlitz Zoo
- 51°8′30″N 14°58′49″E
- Date opened: 1957
- Location: Zittauer Str. 43; 02826 Görlitz, Germany
- Land area: 5 hectares (12 acres)
- No. of animals: 500
- No. of species: 100
- Annual visitors: 140.000 (2015)
- Memberships: EAZA, WAZA
- Owner: Naturschutz-Tierpark Görlitz e. V.
- Director: Sven Hammer
- Website: www.tierpark-goerlitz.de

The Görlitz Zoo (German: Naturschutz-Tierpark Görlitz) is a zoo in Görlitz, in Saxony, Germany.

Founded in 1957, it covers 5 hectares (12.4 acres) and houses 500 animals from 100 species and also some types of domestic breeds.

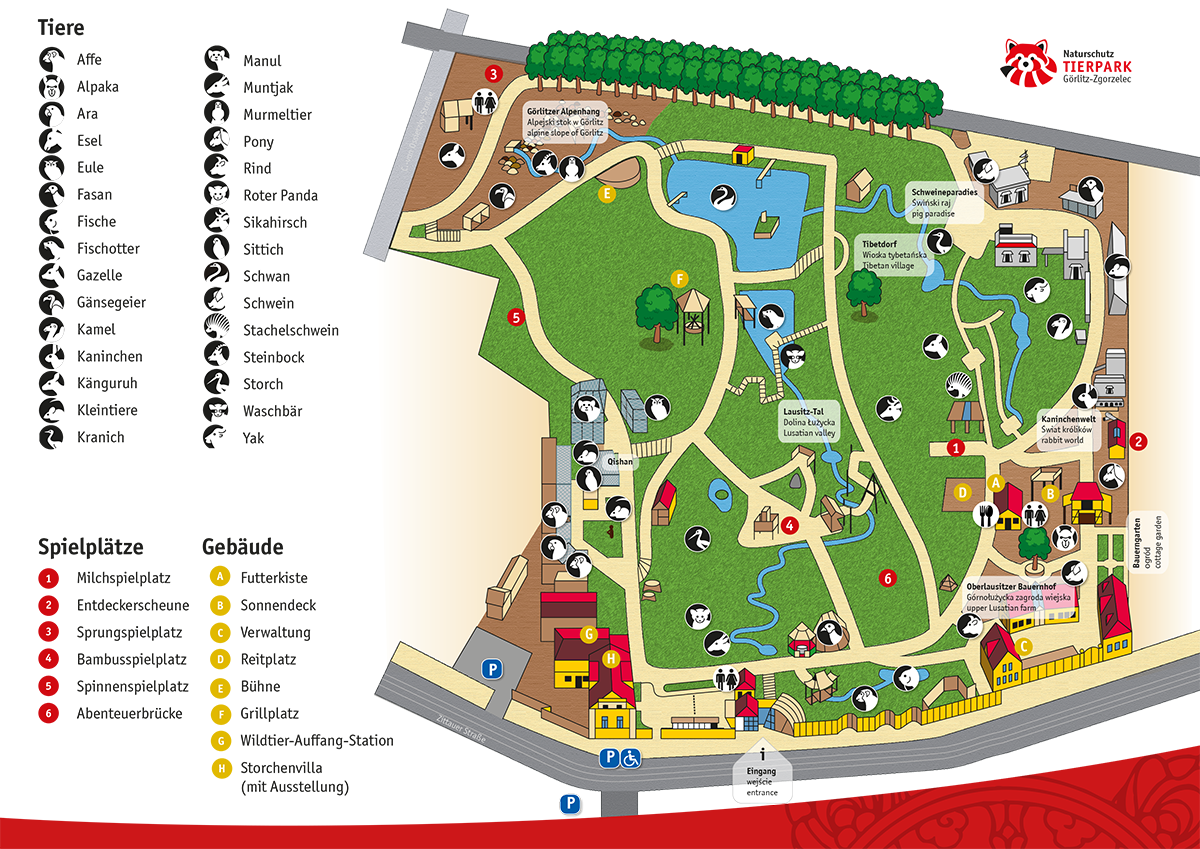
Navigational map of the zoo (in German)

== History ==
Görlitz Zoo was established in 1957 following a decision by the Görlitz city council to create a local zoo. The project was supported by mayor Bruno Gleißberg, horticultural director Henry Kraft, city council cultural affairs director Alfred Kogel, and zoologist Gisela Vater. The site selected was the "Park der Werktätigen" on Zittauer Straße, which had been created from the private park of factory owner Richard Raupach after the Second World War.

The first facilities were constructed in the same year and included enclosures for wild boar and roe deer, a pony stable, and a brown bear enclosure (Bärenzwinger). The bear enclosure was completed in 1958, when two brown bears were introduced. Further facilities were added during the following years, including an aviary, an enclosure for fallow deer, a monkey enclosure, and a kitchen for preparing food for the animals. Seven rhesus macaques from India arrived in 1959.

== Number of visitors ==
- 2011: 105,000
- 2014: 130,000
- 2015: 140,000

== Management ==
- until 2011: Axel Gebauer
- since 2011: Sven Hammer

== Pictures ==
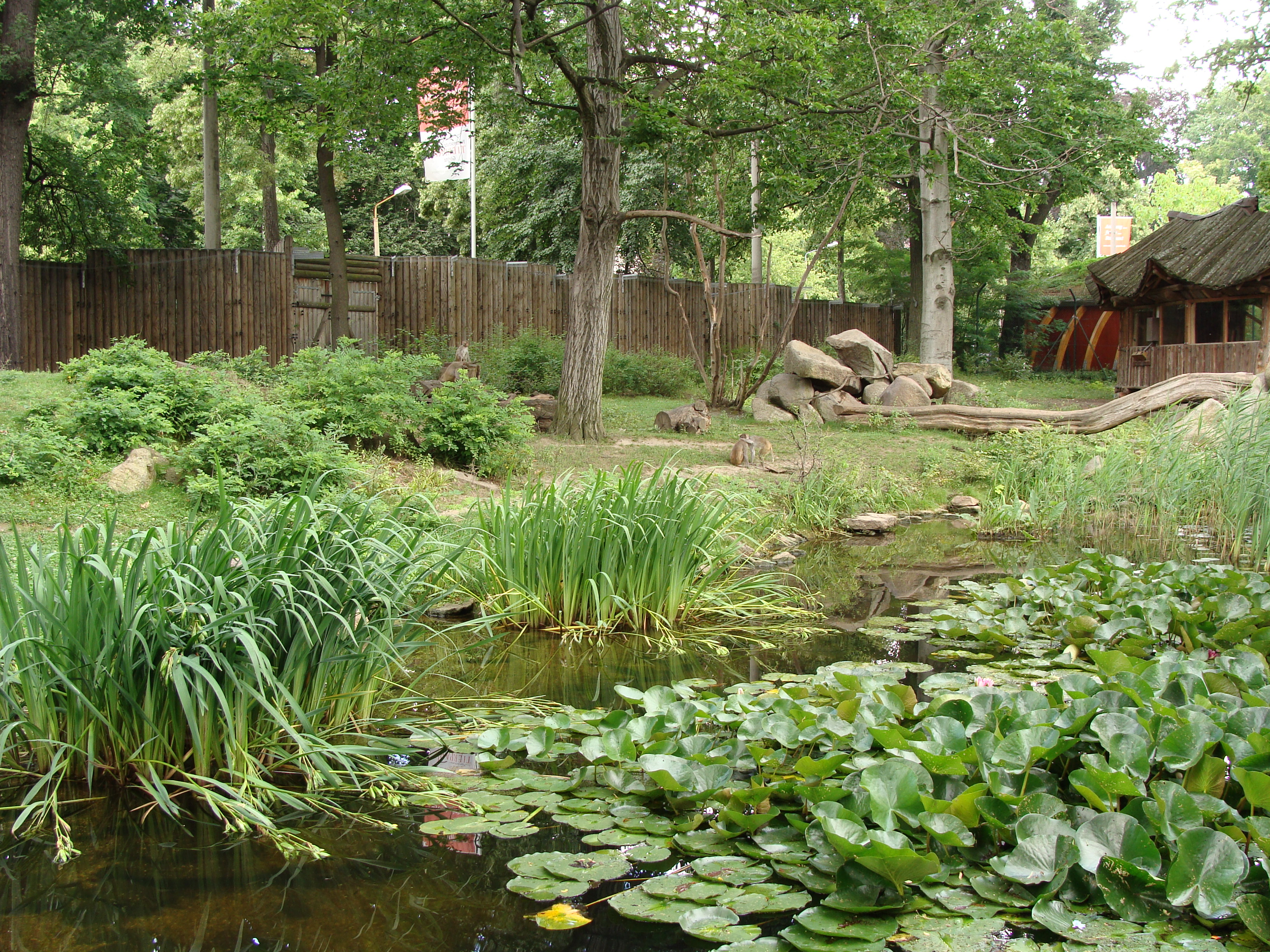

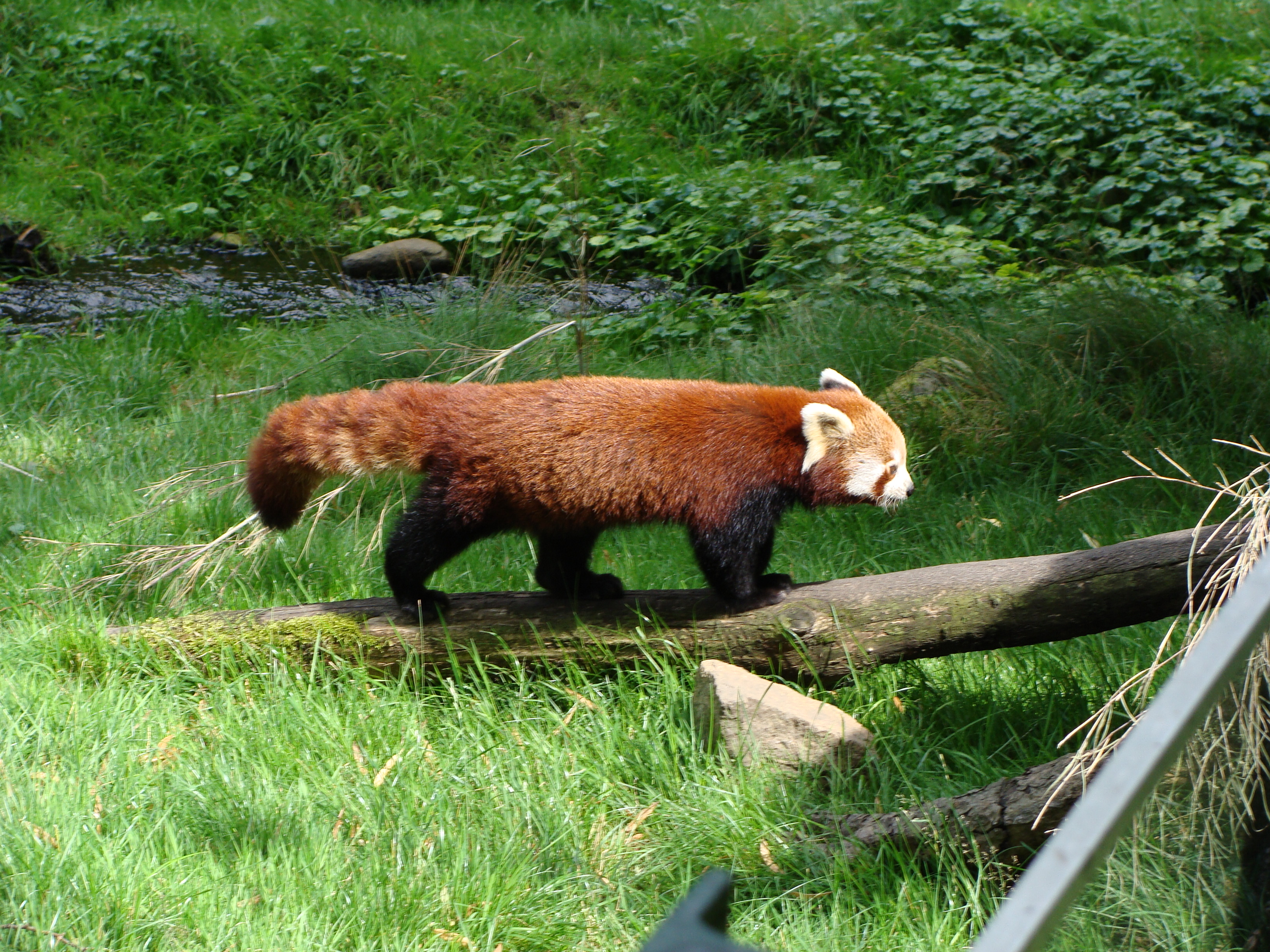

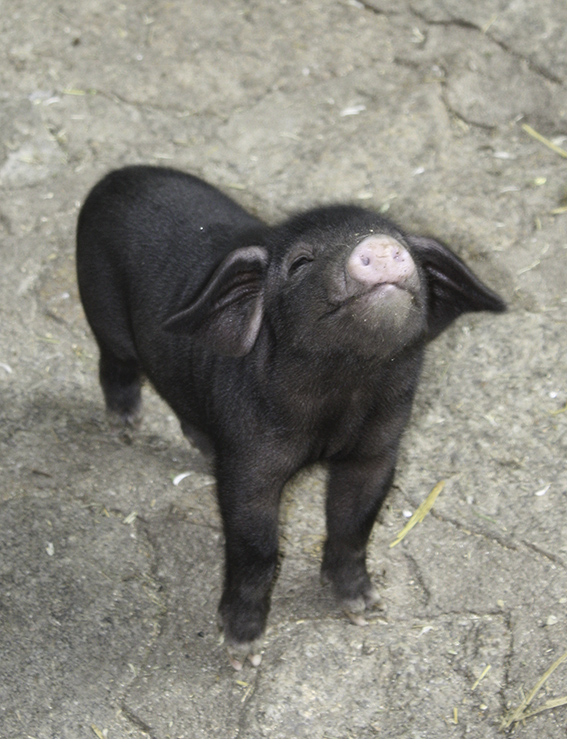

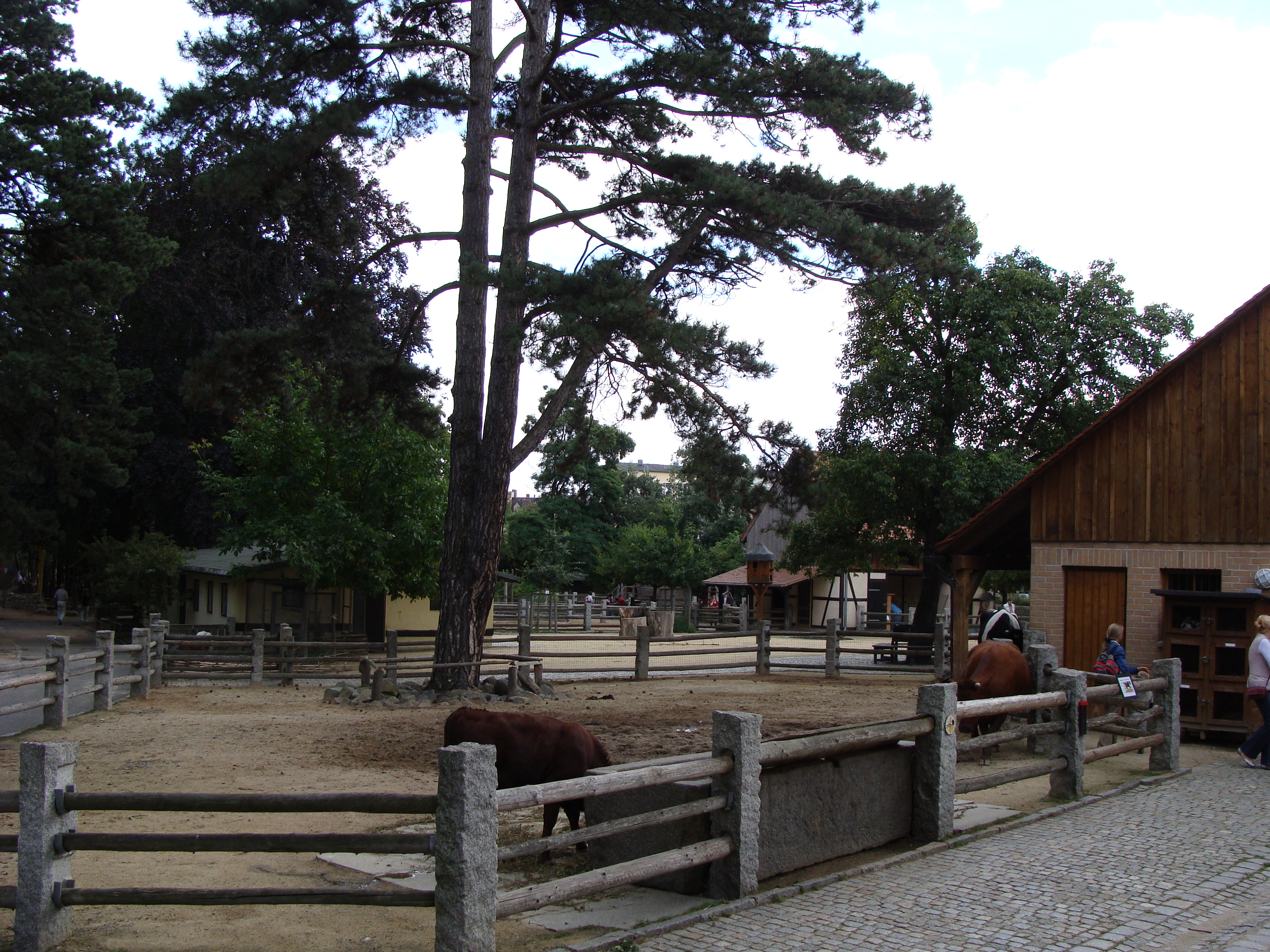

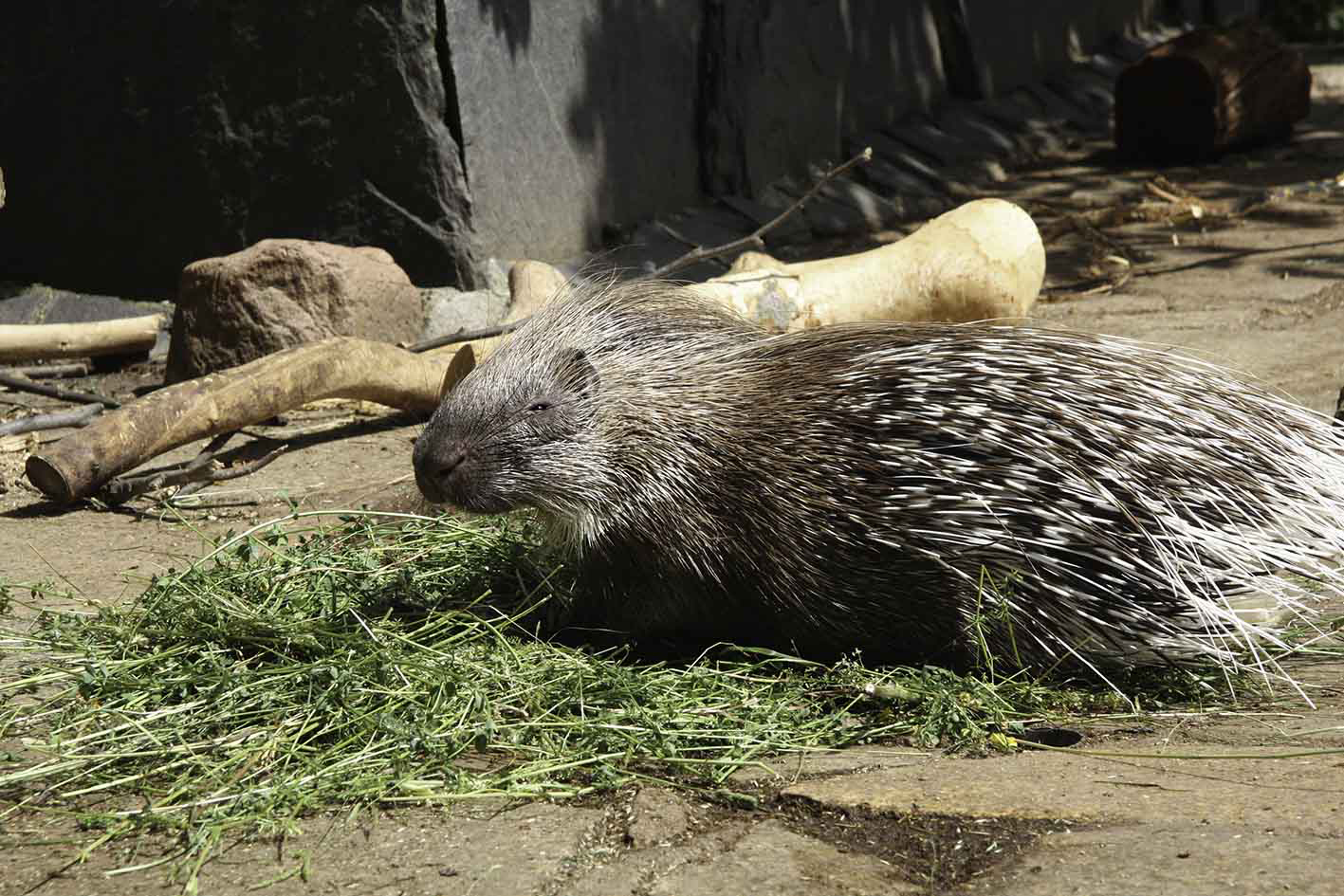

== See also ==
- List of zoos in Germany
