= Cottbus Zoo =

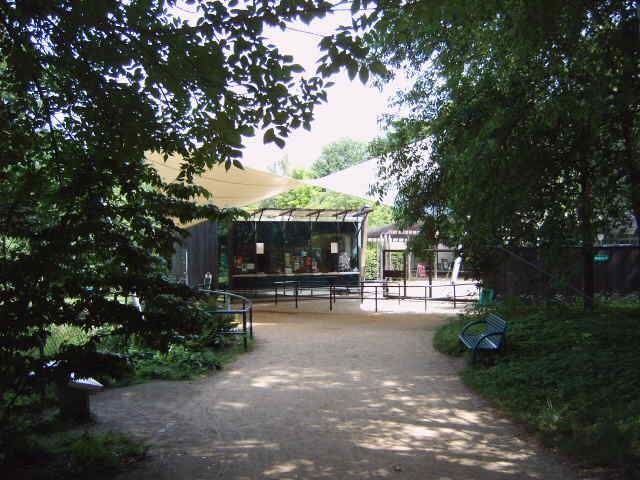
- Interactive map of Cottbus Zoo
- 51°44′35″N 14°21′00″E
- Date opening: 1954
- Location: Kiekebuscher Strasse 5, 03042 Cottbus, Germany
- Land area: 25 hectares (61.8 acres)
- No. of animals: 1300
- No. of species: 170
- Annual visitors: 156.743 (2015)
- Memberships: VdZ
- Owner: Stadt Cottbus
- Website: www.tierparkcottbus.de

The Cottbus Zoo (German: Tierpark Cottbus) is a zoo in the town Cottbus in the Brandenburg region of Germany. The zoo was founded in 1954, and covers 25 hectares (61.8 acres). The park includes a lot of trees, growing along the river Spree. The zoo breeds over 70 species of waterfowl, and its symbol is the red-breasted goose.

== History ==
The zoo's first director, Erhard Frommhold (1956–1963), developed the park into a real Zoological park, and the zoo had status as a Zoo in 1960.

1966 the director was followed by Kunz Rauschert (1963–1966), followed by Klaus Jacob (1966–2002).

1969 was the year of arrival of the first elephant, Sundali.

2002 director Klaus Jacob retired and was replaced by Dr. Jens Kämmerling.

== Pictures ==
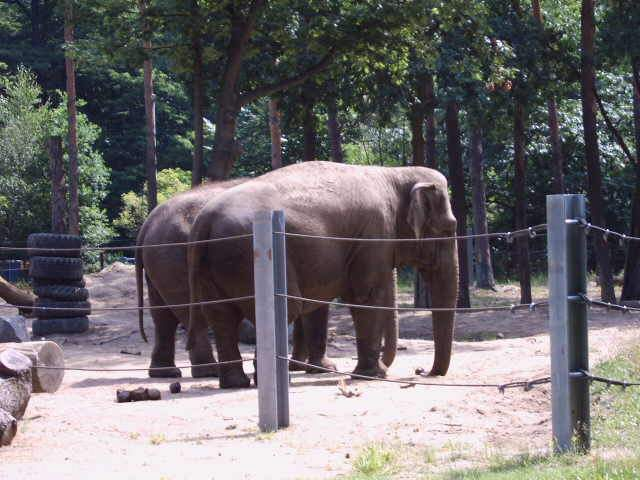
Elephants

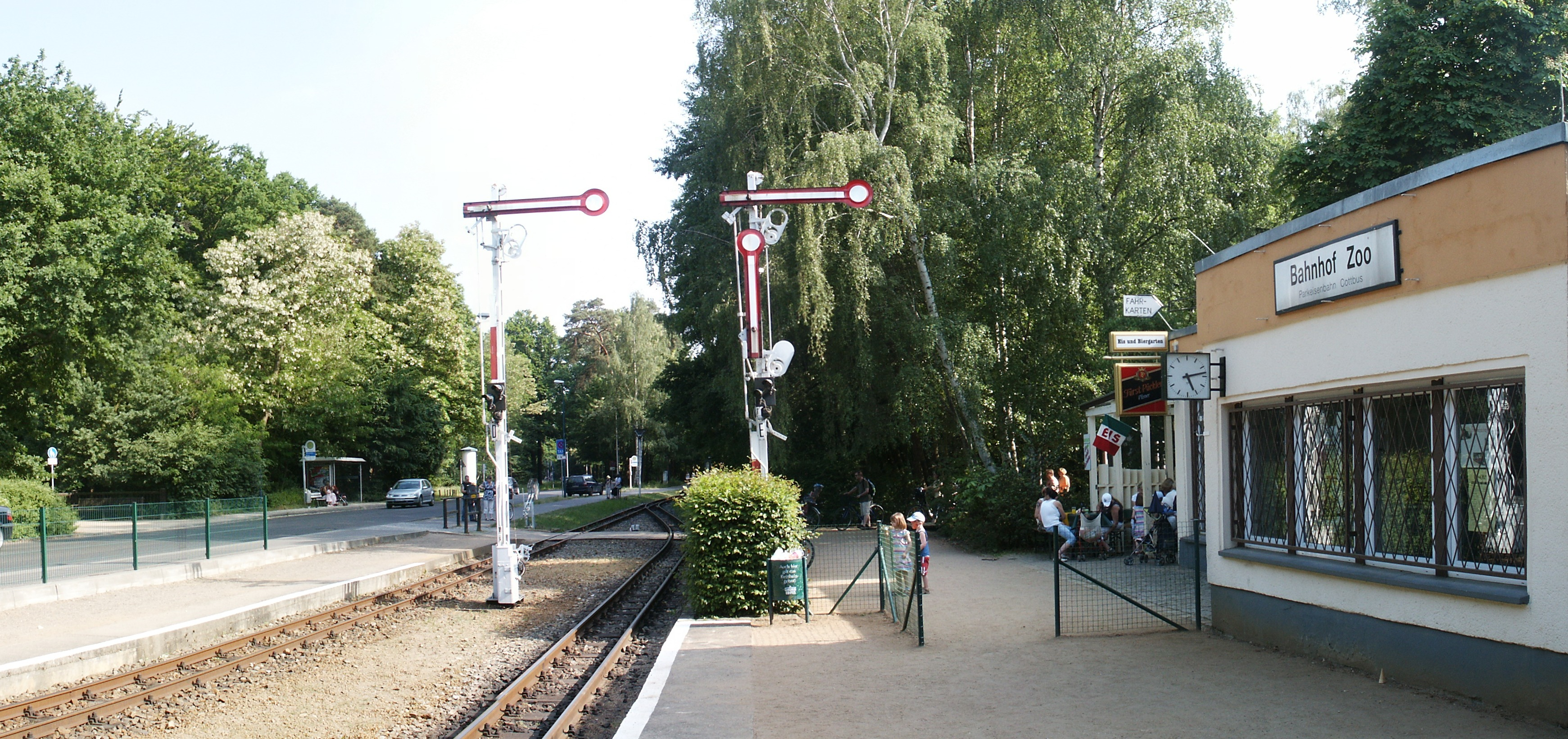

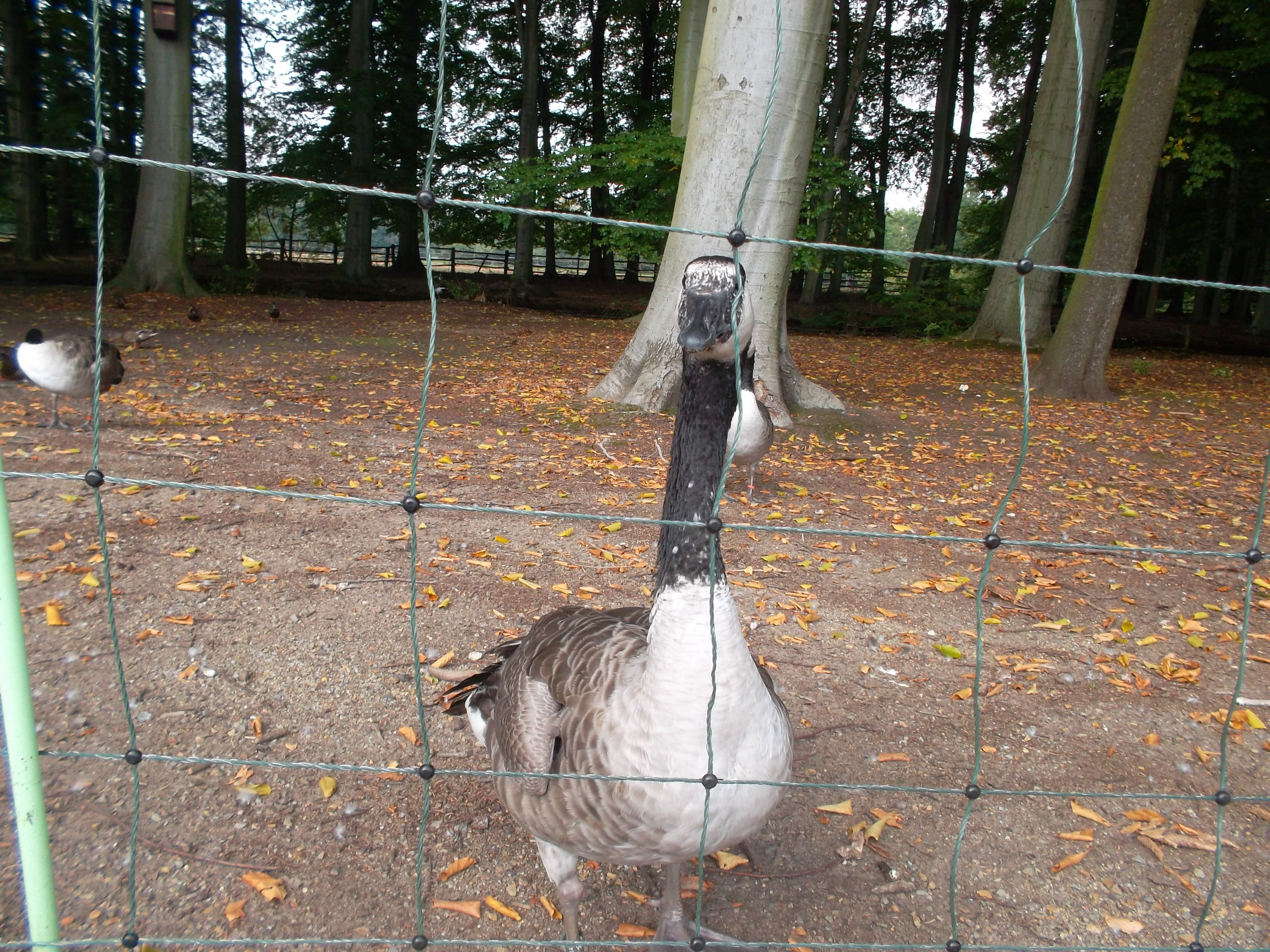
Giant Canada goose

== See also ==
- List of zoos in Germany
