= Magdeburg Zoo =

- Interactive map of Magdeburg Zoo
- 52°10′3″N 11°38′29″E
- Date opened: 1950
- Location: Zooallee 1, 39124 Magdeburg, Germany
- Land area: 16 hectares (39.5 acres)
- No. of animals: 1009
- No. of species: 223
- Annual visitors: approx.: 300,000
- Memberships: Vdz, EAZA, WAZA
- Owner: Zoologischer Garten Magdeburg gGmbH
- Director: David Pruß
- Website: www.zoo-magdeburg.de (in German)

Magdeburg Zoo (German: Zoologischer Garten Magdeburg or Zoo Magdeburg) is a zoo in the city of Magdeburg in the region Sachsen-Anhalt, Germany. The zoo was founded in 1950, and covers 16 hectares (39.5 acres).

== About the Zoo ==
Spanning 16 hectares (39.5 acres), the zoo welcomes approximately 340,000 visitors annually. Set within a park environment in the Neue Neustadt area, it also features a children's playground. Since 1980, Magdeburg Zoo has been home to flatland tapirs (Tapirus terrestris), recording 31 births from three females up to 2018. A total of fifteen male and sixteen female pups were born, with six males and nine females reaching adulthood. The last female cub was raised by bottle-feeding.

In 2015, the zoo kept around 1400 animals from 190 species.

== History ==
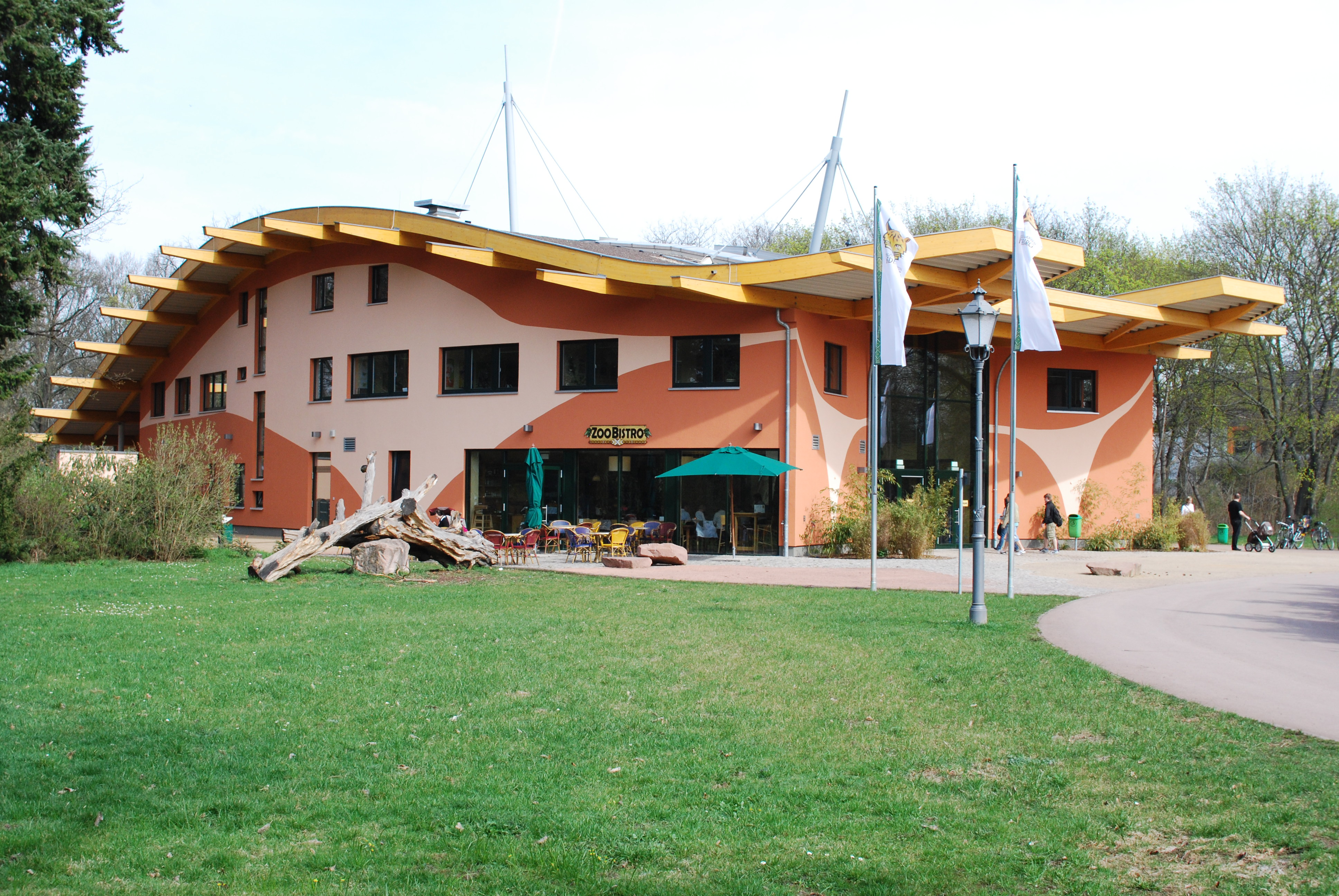
Entrance of the zoo

After the Second World War there was a public interest to develop a zoological garden. Many volunteers took part in the creation of the Magdeburger Tiergarten, which opened 1 July 1950.

1957 it was decided to make the zoo larger, and in 1959 it had an areal of 20 ha, and the name was changed to Zoologischer Garten Magdeburg, shortened to Zoo Magdeburg.

In 1960 the first elephant arrived from Assam in India, a female Asian elephant called Sonja, who died of elephant smallpox in 1971.

From 1979 to 1998, during the appointment for the new director, Zoologist Wolfgang Puschmann, the zoo became internationally famous for its breeding of black rhinos and other threatened species.

1981 started a renovation of the zoo, and a lot of classical exhibits were replaced by more modern enclosures.

== Pictures ==
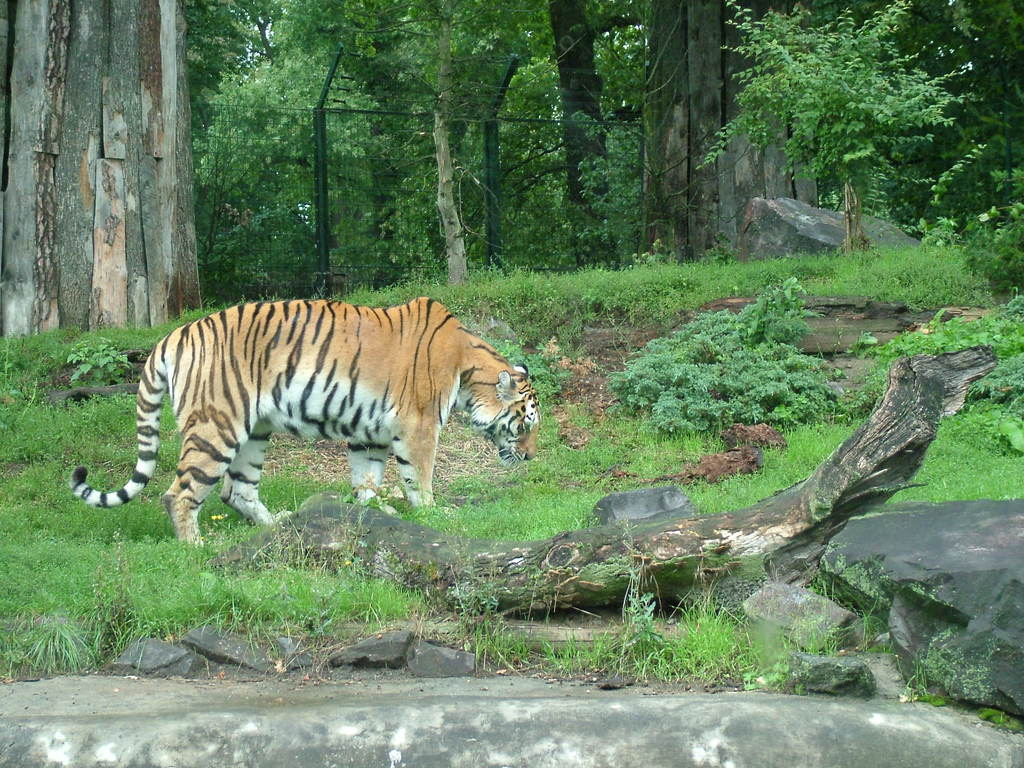

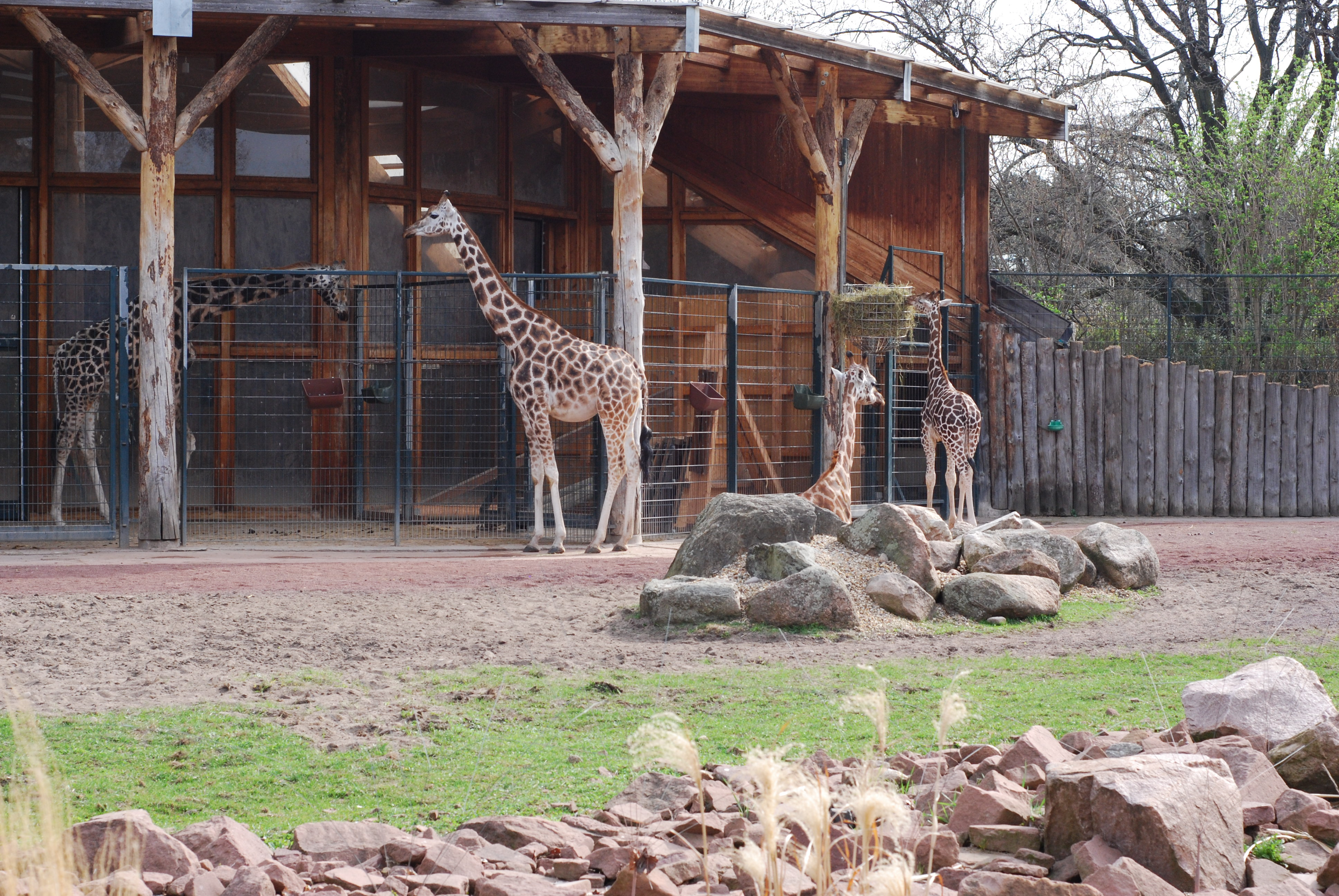

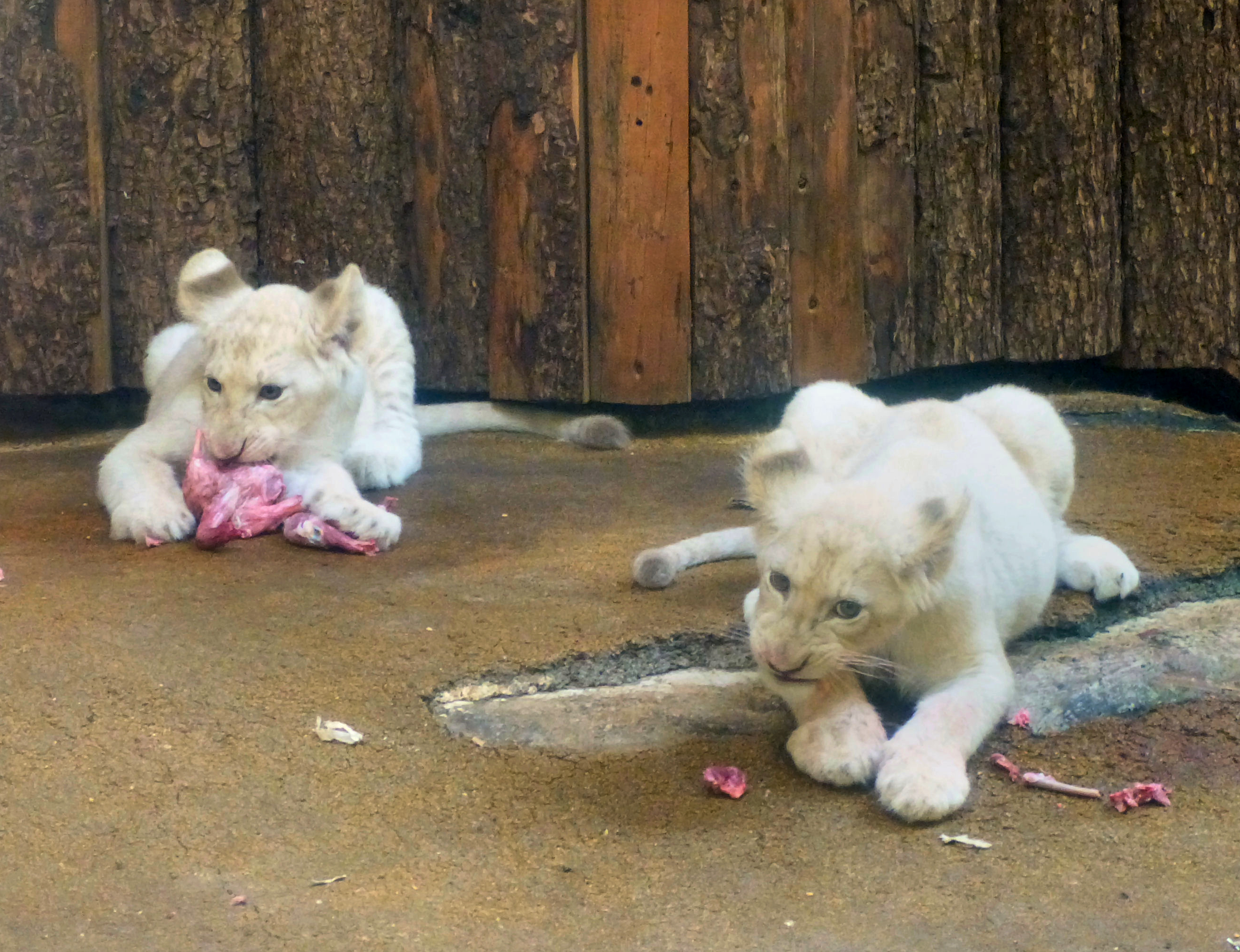

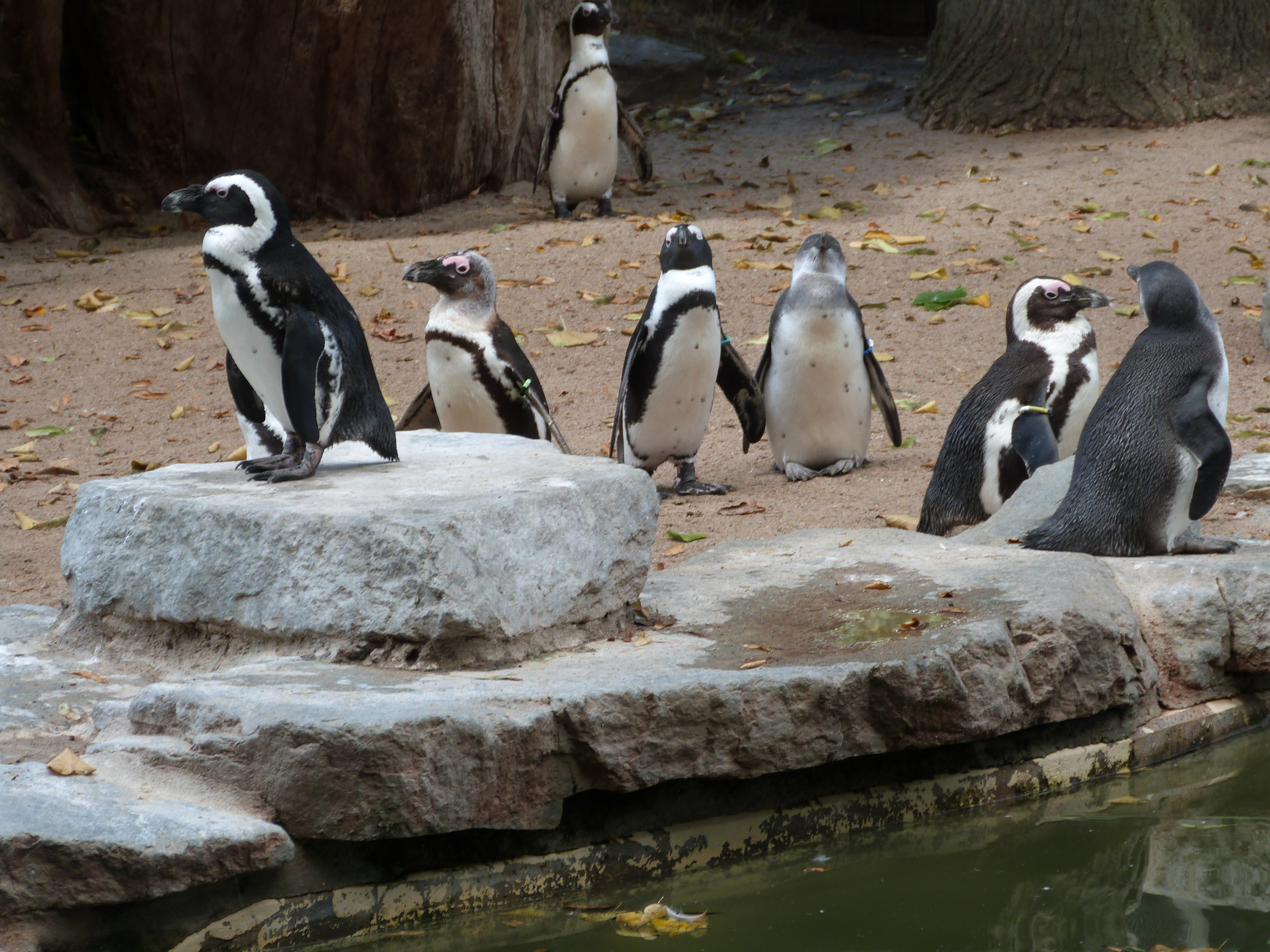

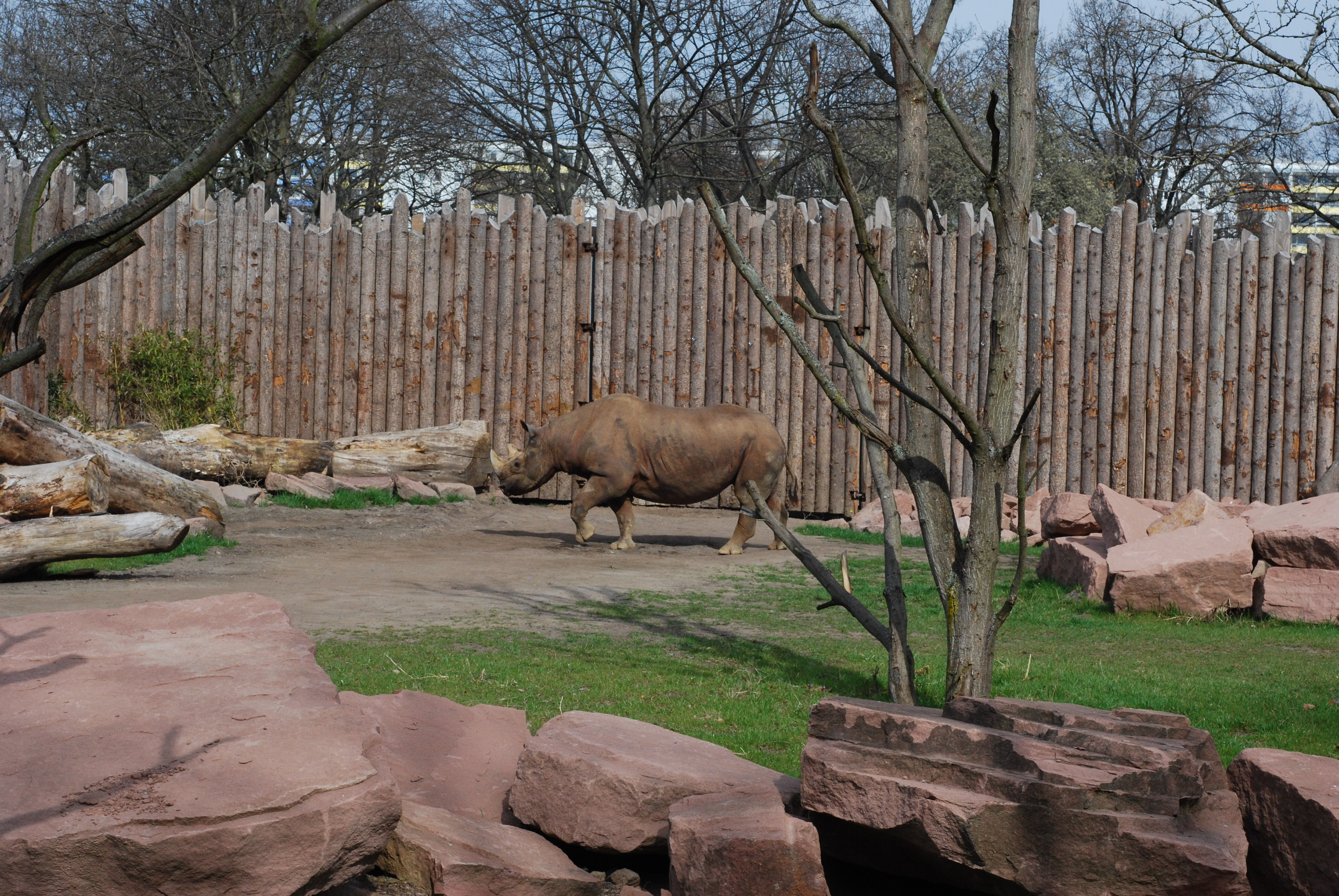

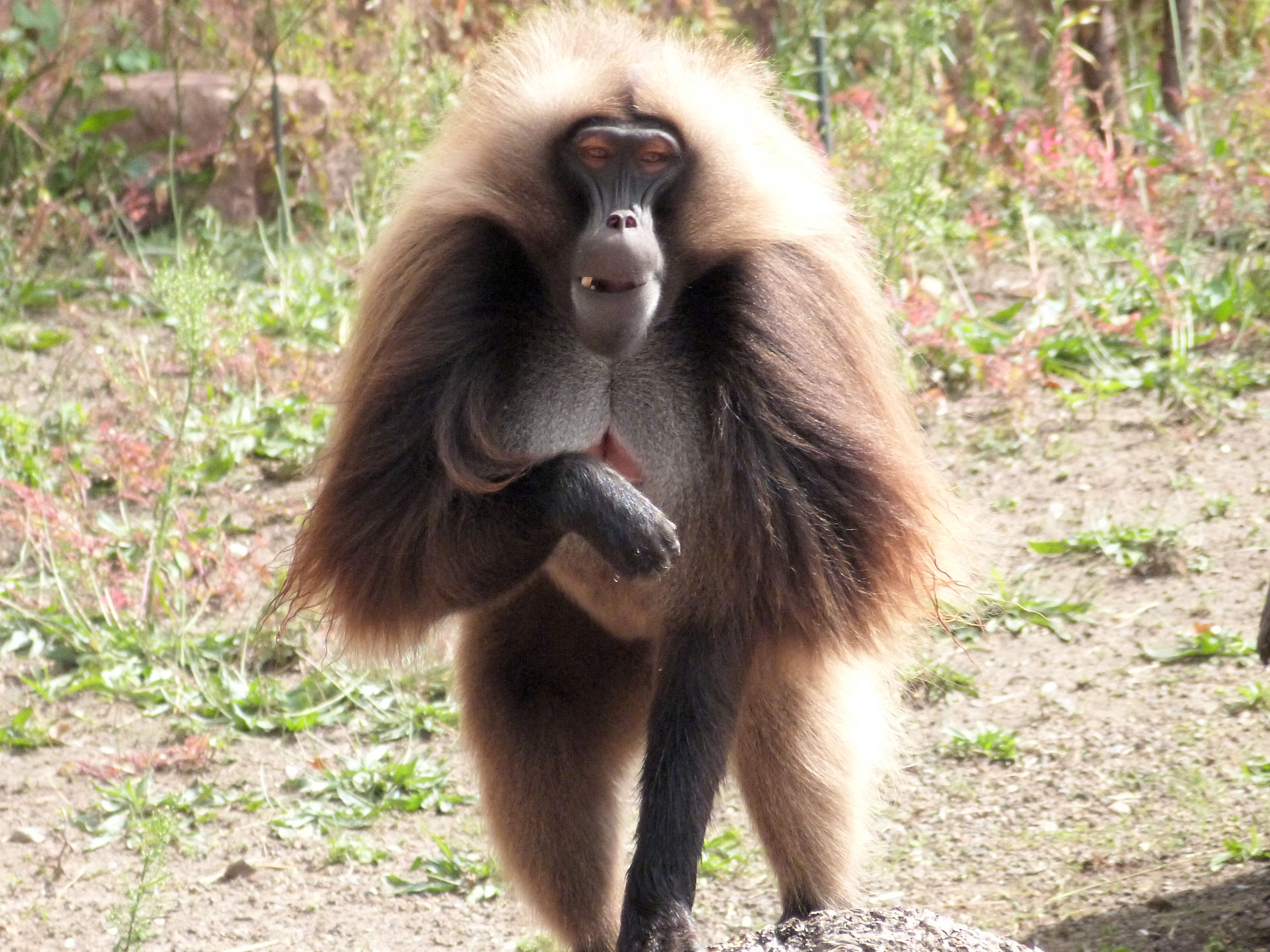

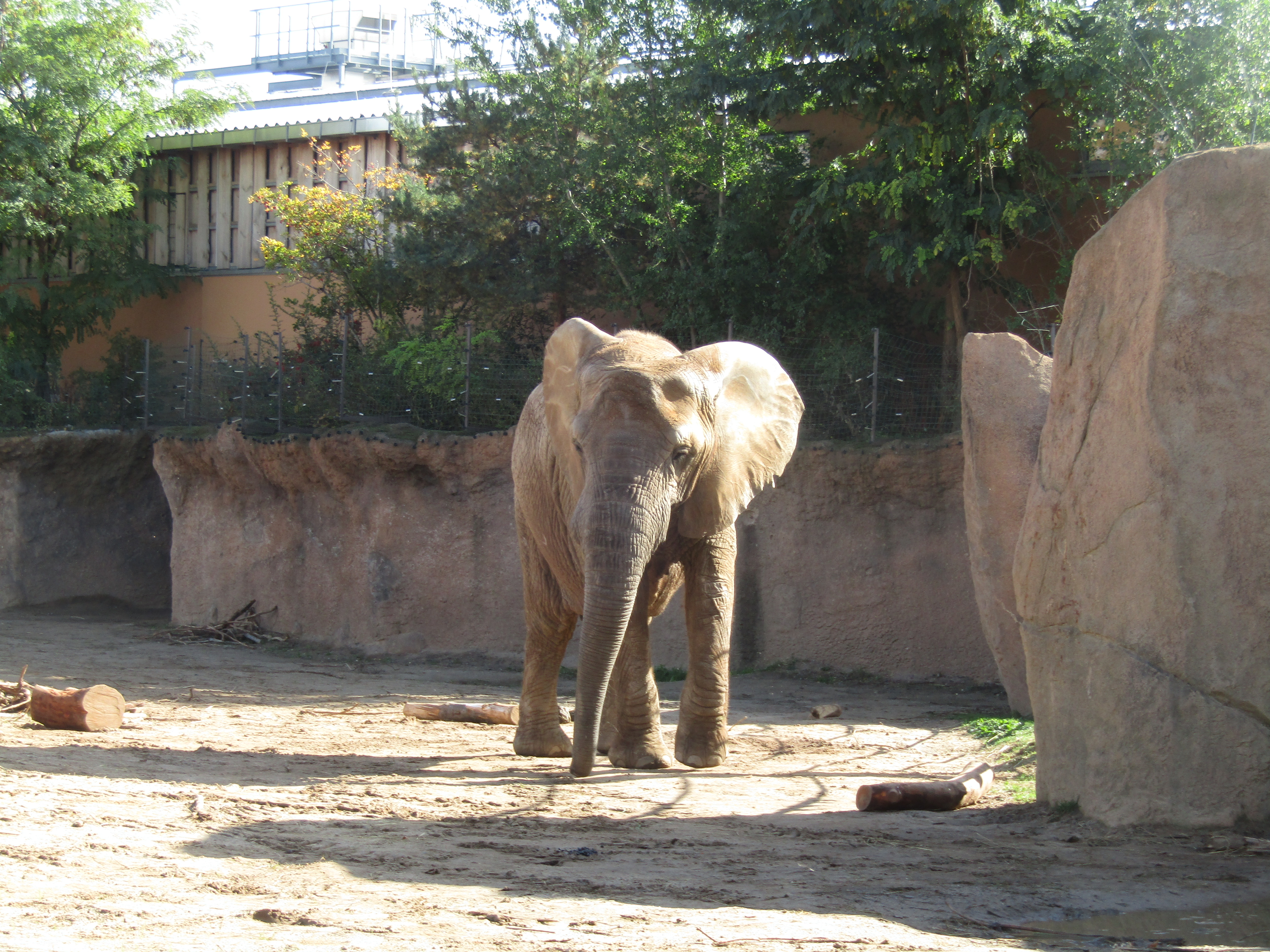

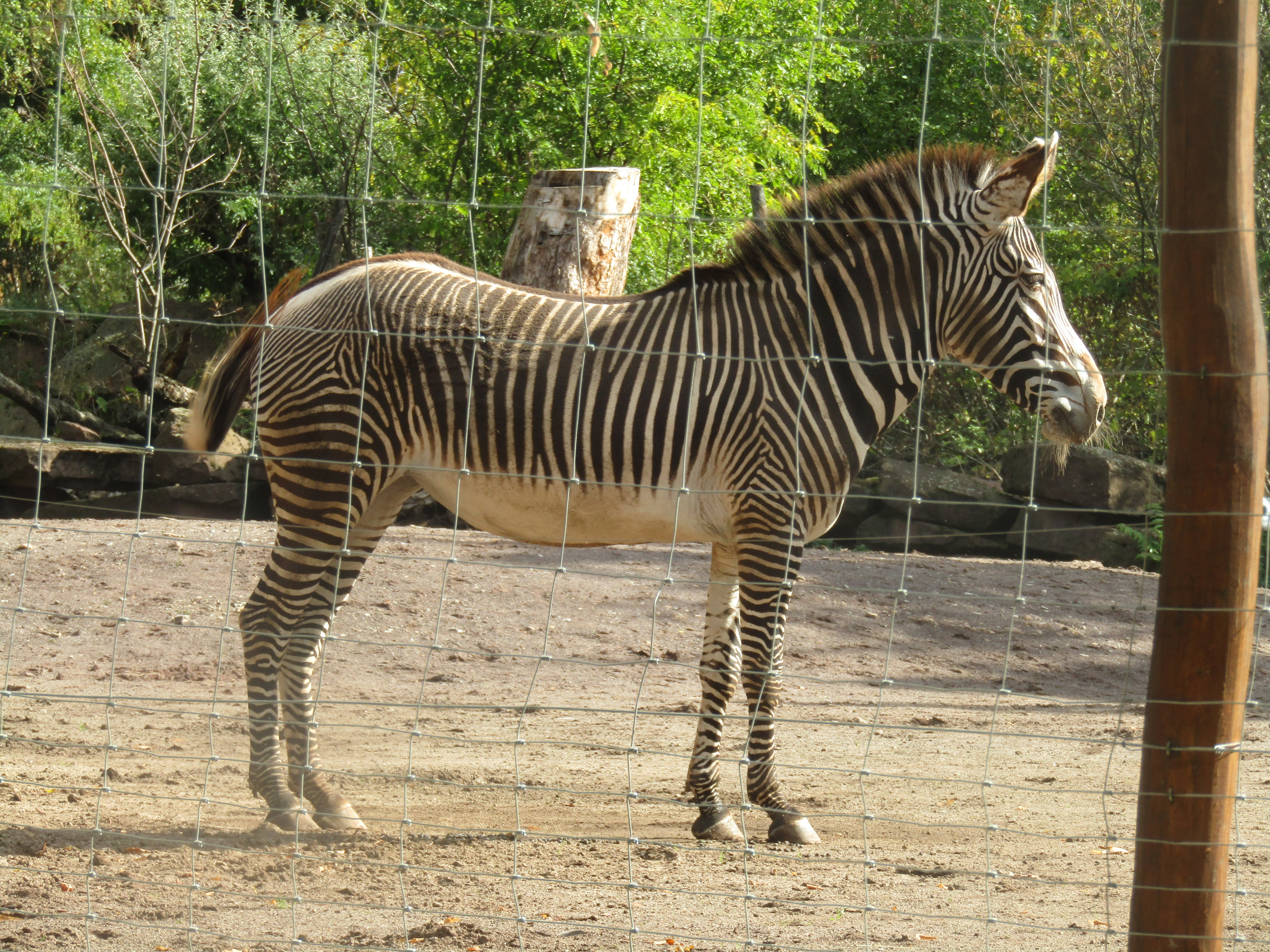

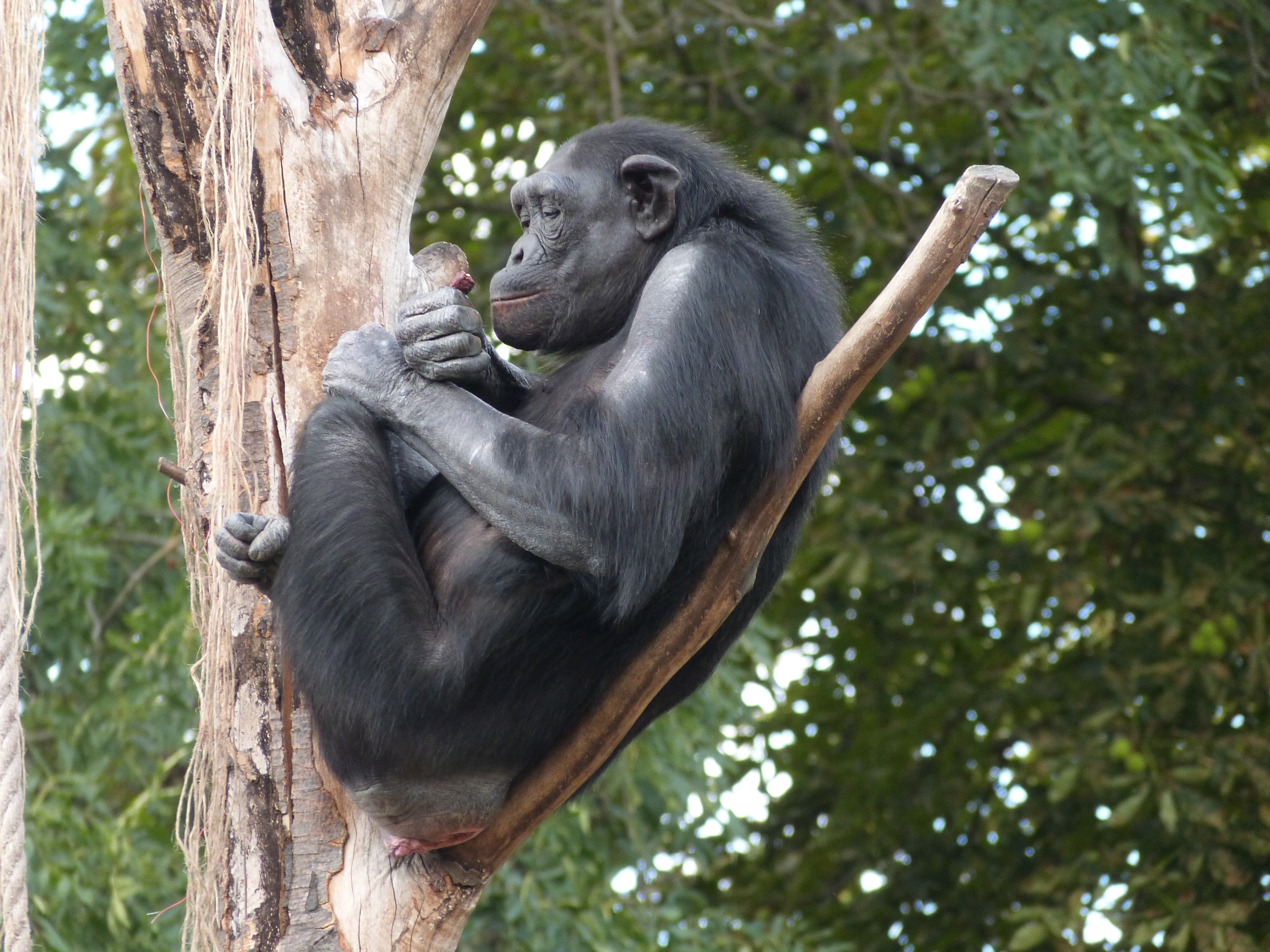

== Literature ==
- Michael Schröpel: Im Zeichen des Luchses. 50 Jahre Zoo Magdeburg. Magdeburg ohne Jahr, ohne ISBN
- Björn Encke et al.: 60 Jahre Zoo Magdeburg. Von A–Z. Hrsg.: Zoologischer Garten Magdeburg. Klaus Schüling Verlag, Münster 2010. ISBN 978-3-86523-165-9.

== See also ==
- List of zoos in Germany
