= Hirschfeld Wildlife Park =

Zoo in Germany

Hirschfeld Wildlife Park (Tierpark Hirschfeld)
- Interactive map of Hirschfeld Wildlife Park (Tierpark Hirschfeld)
- 50°37′40″N 12°26′25″E
- Date opened: 1954
- Land area: 6 ha (15 acres)
- No. of animals: 600
- No. of species: 90
- Website: http://tierpark.hirschfeld-sachsen.de/

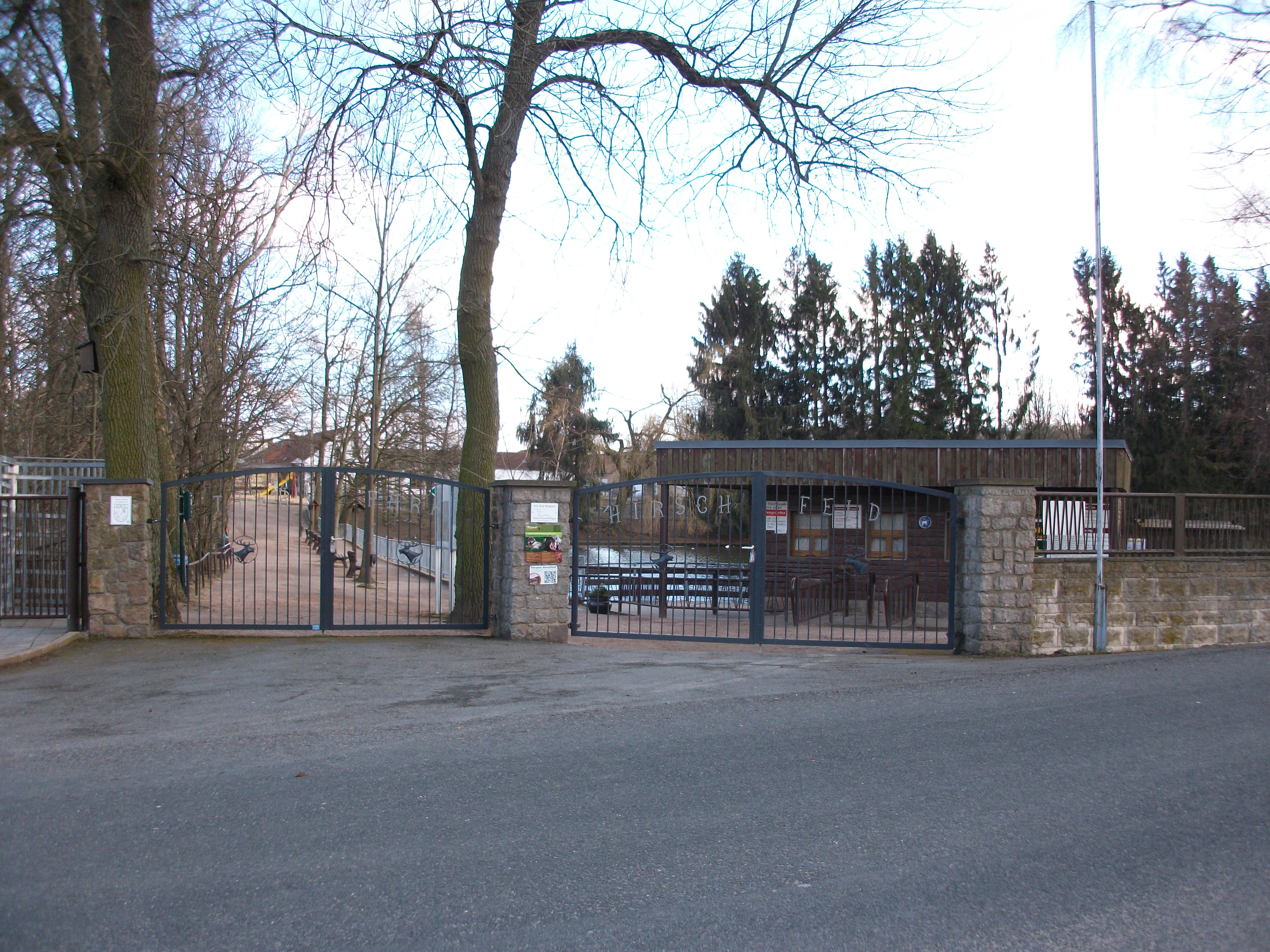
Hirschfeld Wildlife Park, entrance, 2019

Hirschfeld Wildlife Park (German: Tierpark Hirschfeld) is in Voigtsgrün, part of the municipality of Hirschfeld, near Zwickau in the German Free State of Saxony.

Records by Martha von Arnim (née von Schlegell) indicate that the site and its stand of trees had been protected for centuries. Maps from 1870 show that a wildlife enclosure already existed at the site. It belonged to Alexander von Arnim, who kept red deer there. Around 1890, a hunting lodge was built within the enclosure; the building still exists and is known as the "log cabin" (Blockhaus). In 1909, his brother, Arno von Arnim, inherited Voigtsgrün and the animal enclosure.

The foundation of the present-day wildlife park was laid in 1956. The original site covered about 6 hectares and contains trees up to 450 years old.

Today, the park contains approximately 600 animals representing 90 species. These include raccoon dogs, wild boar, bears, gray wolves, pot-bellied pigs, waders, Heidschnucken, raccoons, porcupines, mouflon, bison, snowy owls, monkeys, and ferrets.

In addition to the animal enclosures, the park has a petting zoo, restaurants, a minigolf course, and a children's playground.
