= Hirschfeld, Saxony =

Hirschfeld
- Municipality
- Location of Hirschfeld within Zwickau district
- Interactive map of Hirschfeld
- Location within Germany Location within Saxony
- Coordinates: 50°37′32″N 12°27′34″E
- Country: Germany
- State: Saxony
- District: Zwickau
- Subdivisions: 3

Government
  - Mayor (2022–29): Rainer Pampel

Area
  - Total: 18.98 km^{2} (7.33 sq mi)
- Elevation: 380 m (1,250 ft)

Population (2025-12-31)
  - Total: 1,011
  - Density: 53.27/km^{2} (138.0/sq mi)
- Time zone: UTC+01:00 (CET)
  - Summer (DST): UTC+02:00 (CEST)
- Postal codes: 08144
- Dialling codes: 037607
- Vehicle registration: Z
- Website: www.hirschfeld-sachsen.de

Hirschfeld (German pronunciation: [ˈhɪʁʃfɛlt]) is a municipality in the district Zwickau, in Saxony, Germany.

It is home to the Hirschfeld Wildlife Park.
