= Großenaspe =

- Municipality
- Flag Coat of arms

- Location of Großenaspe within Segeberg district
- Interactive map of Großenaspe
- Location within Germany Location within Schleswig-Holstein
- Coordinates: 53°58′N 9°58′E
- Country: Germany
- State: Schleswig-Holstein
- District: Segeberg
- Municipal assoc.: Bad Bramstedt-Land

Government
  - Mayor: Torsten Klinger

Area
  - Total: 45.62 km^{2} (17.61 sq mi)
- Elevation: 33 m (108 ft)

Population (2025-12-31)
  - Total: 3,098
  - Density: 67.91/km^{2} (175.9/sq mi)
- Time zone: UTC+01:00 (CET)
  - Summer (DST): UTC+02:00 (CEST)
- Postal codes: 24623
- Dialling codes: 04320, 04327
- Vehicle registration: SE
- Website: www.grossenaspe.de

Großenaspe is a municipality in the district of Segeberg in Schleswig-Holstein, Germany.

== Geography ==
Großenaspe lies about 10 km (6 mi) south of Neumünster.

== Politics ==
After the 2003 election, the 17 seats of the Großenaspe community council are filled by eleven CDU members, three SPD members, and the remaining three are filled by members from the Green Party and the FDP along with one independent.
