= List of zoological gardens and aquariums in United Kingdom =

The following is a list of zoos and aquariums in the United Kingdom, Crown Dependencies and British Overseas Territories

Zoos in the UK are legally required to be licensed by local authorities under the Zoo Licensing Act 1981, but many are also members of the British and Irish Association of Zoos and Aquariums.

== List ==
- Africa Alive!
- Alameda Wildlife Conservation Park, Gibraltar
- All Things Wild
- Amazon World Zoo Park
- Amazona Zoo
- Amazonia at Strathclyde Country Park
- ARK Wildlife Park
- Auchingarrich Wildlife Park
- Banham Zoo
- Battersea Park Children's Zoo
- Baytree Owl and Wildlife Centre
- BCA Zoo
- Beale Wildlife Park
- Becky Falls Woodland Park
- Belfast Zoological Gardens
- The Big Cat Sanctuary
- Birdland Park and Gardens
- Birdworld
- Birmingham Wildlife Conservation Park
- Blackpool Zoo Park
- Blair Drummond Safari Park
- Blue Planet Aquarium
- Blue Reef Aquarium
- Bristol Zoo Project
- British Wildlife Centre
- Calderglen Country Park Zoo
- Call of the Wild Zoo
- Camperdown Wildlife Centre
- Cayman Parrot Sanctuary, Cayman Islands
- Cayman Turtle Centre, Cayman Islands
- Chessington World of Adventures
- Chester Zoo
- Chew Valley Animal Park
- Colchester Zoo
- Combe Martin Wildlife and Dinosaur Park
- Cotswold Wildlife Park
- Crocodiles of the World
- Curraghs Wildlife Park
- Dartmoor Zoological Park
- Deep Sea World
- The Deep
- Drayton Manor Zoo
- Drusillas Park
- Dudley Zoological Gardens
- Eagle Heights Wildlife Foundation
- Edinburgh Zoo
- Exmoor Zoo
- Exotic Zoo
- Fife Zoo
- Filey Bird Garden & Animal Park
- Five Sisters Zoo
- Flamingo Land Resort
- Folly Farm
- Gauntlet Bird of Prey - Eagle and Vulture Park
- Gentleshaw Wildlife Centre
- Golders Hill Park Zoo
- Hadlow College
- Hamerton Zoo Park
- Hanwell Zoo
- Hawk Conservancy Trust
- Hemsley Conservation Centre
- Hertfordshire Zoo
- Highland Wildlife Park
- Hobbledown Ltd
- Hoo Zoo and Dinosaur World
- Howletts Wild Animal Park
- International Centre for Birds of Prey
- Jersey Zoo
- Jimmy's Farm and Wildlife Park
- Johnsons of Old Hurst
- Kirkleatham Owl Centre
- Knowsley Safari Park
- Lake District Coast Aquarium
- Lake District Wildlife Park
- Lakeland Wildlife Oasis
- Lakes Aquarium
- Lincoln Zoo
- Lincolnshire Wildlife Park
- Linton Zoological Gardens
- The Living Rainforest
- London Zoo
- Longleat Safari and Adventure Park
- Lotherton Wildlife World
- Mablethorpe Seal Sanctuary and Wildlife Centre
- Manor House Wildlife Park
- Marwell Wildlife
- The Meadows Wildlife Park
- Messingham Zoo
- Monkey Haven
- Monkey World
- National Centre for Birds of Prey
- National Marine Aquarium
- National Sea Life Centre
- Natureland Seal Sanctuary
- New Forest Wildlife Park
- Newquay Zoo
- Noah's Ark Zoo Farm
- Northumberland Zoo
- Northumberland College Zoo
- Old MacDonald's Farm & Fun Park
- Paignton Zoo
- Paradise Park
- Peak Wildlife Park
- Pensthorpe Natural Park
- Ponderosa Zoo
- Port Lympne Wild Animal Park
- Queen Elizabeth II Botanic Garden, Cayman Islands
- Raptor Foundation
- Reaseheath College
- Riverside Garden
- Sealife Adventure
- Sea Life Brighton
- Sea Life London Aquarium
- Sea Life Weymouth
- The Scottish Deer Centre
- Shaldon Zoo
- Shepreth Wildlife Park
- Skegness Aquarium
- Sparsholt College Hampshire
- Stratford Butterfly Farm
- Tattershall Farm Park
- Thrigby Hall Wildlife Gardens
- Tilgate Nature Centre
- Trentham Monkey Forest
- Tropical Birdland
- Tropical Butterfly House
- Tropical World (Leeds)
- Tropiquaria Zoo
- Twycross Zoo
- Watatunga Wildlife Reserve
- Welsh Mountain Zoo
- West Midlands Safari Park
- Whipsnade Zoo
- Wild Zoological Park
- Wildheart Animal Sanctuary
- Wildwood Trust
- Wingham Wildlife Park
- Woburn Safari Park
- Wolds Wildlife Park
- Woodside Animal Farm
- WWT Arundel
- WWT Castle Espie
- WWT Llanelli Wetland Centre
- WWT London Wetland Centre
- WWT Martin Mere
- WWT Slimbridge
- WWT Washington
- Yorkshire Wildlife Park
