= Cat Survival Trust =

The Cat Survival Trust was an animal sanctuary in Welwyn, Hertfordshire, England. The site was founded by Terrence Moore in 1976. It did not have a zoo licence and was only open for members and schools. Concerns grew about visitor safety and animal welfare. In 2024, Moore was convicted of animal welfare charges and banned from keeping animals for five years. Five of his 28 animals were euthanised, and the others were rehomed.

== History and description ==
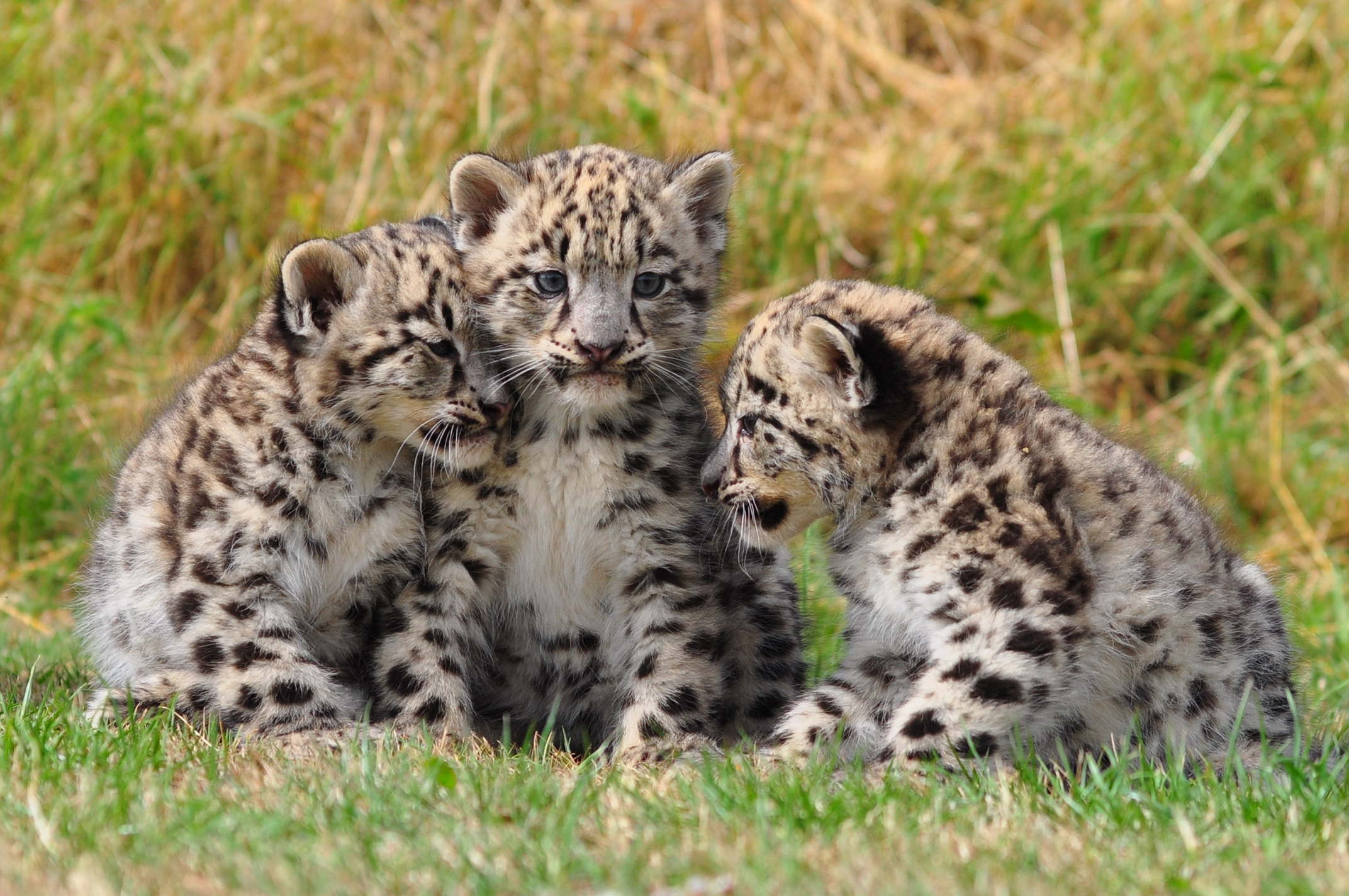
Three snow leopard cubs at the site in 2010

Terrence Moore was a Lloyd's of London broker when he was saddened to see a civet for sale at Harrods. In 1976, he established the sanctuary on a 12-acre former farm site. The aim of the charitable organisation was to take in former zoo animals and confiscated animals, and to breed endangered species for a return to the wild. By 2016, the site had homed over 2,000 cats and 250 had been born there. In addition to felines, he kept lemurs and raccoon dogs.

The site was only open for members, schools, and scientific visits. As such, it had an unassuming facade, and enclosures were not labelled. Membership could be bought for £7, or for a lifetime at £200, while the site did not have a zoo licence. Visitors stroked and hand-fed big cats with their own food; in 2013, a former trustee said that he resigned due to this danger and a lack of insurance.

In 2008, Moore was a guest on The Paul O'Grady Show, and brought a snow leopard for Katy Perry to hold. Snow Leopards of Leafy London, a seven-part documentary on Animal Planet, was filmed at the site. The choice of location was due to the difficulties in accessing and observing snow leopards in Asia.

== Investigation and conviction ==
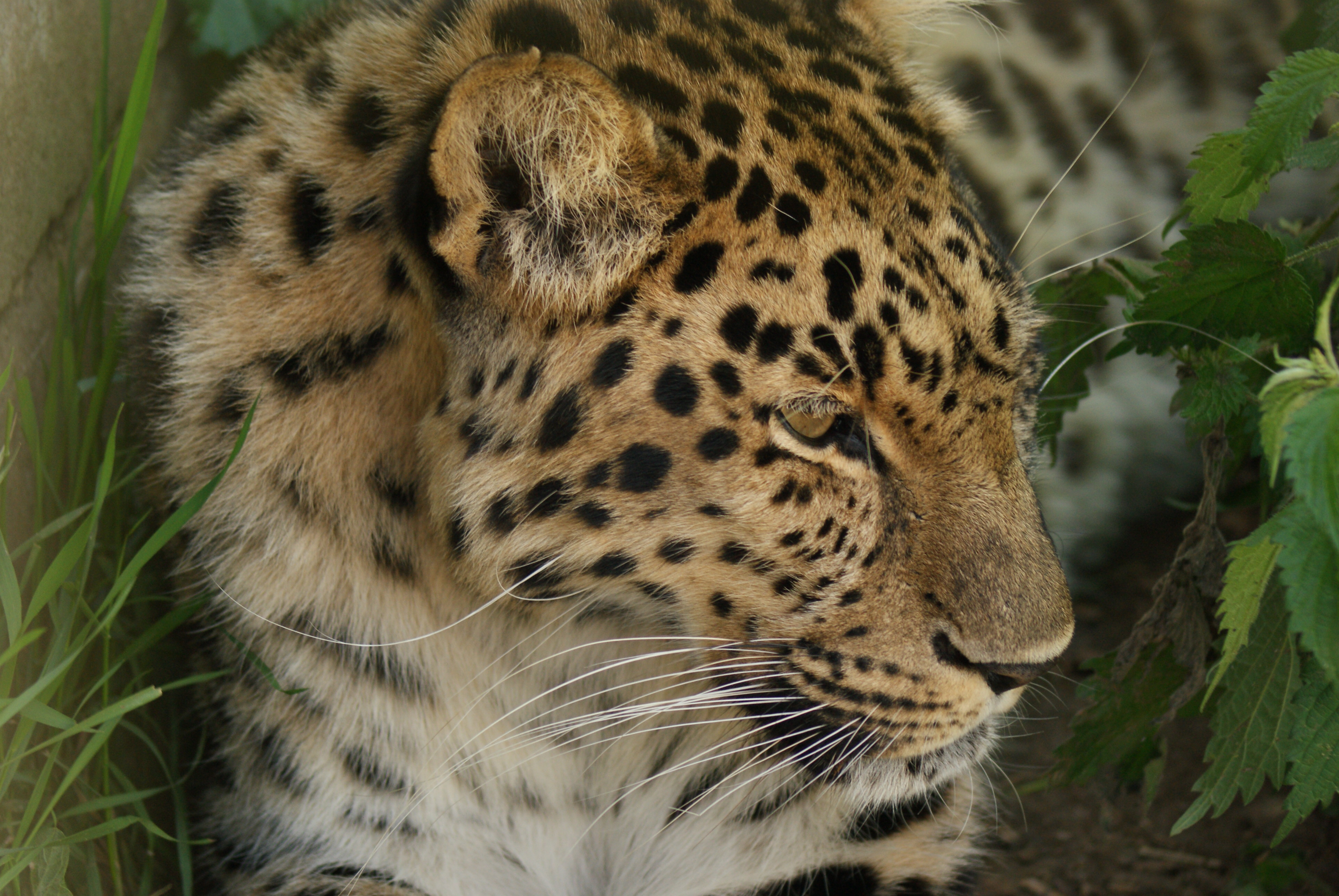
A critically endangered Amur leopard at the site in 2017. The species was among the animals rehomed from the site after Terrence Moore's conviction.

Police investigated the site in July 2022 with a vet and encountered sick animals. They returned eight months later and found 20 frozen animal bodies, with no records of death. In January 2024, Moore was charged with 28 counts relating to animal welfare: eight of unnecessary suffering to endangered species, four of failing to meet needs, and 16 of using endangered animals for commercial gain without a licence. In May at St Albans Crown Court, he was convicted of four charges of suffering and seven of the commercial charges.

The prosecution said that Moore disliked modern medicine, and preferred homeopathic treatment for animals. The big cats were not vaccinated, nor were domestic cats who wandered the site. He was fined £10,000 and was issued a five-year ban on keeping animals, effective from when the animals would be rehomed.

In November 2024, Moore was hospitalised after being attacked by one of his own pumas. His ban was issued in January 2025. Of his 28 animals, five were euthanised, and the rest were rehomed at sites including Hertfordshire Zoo and The Big Cat Sanctuary in Kent. The cats included a critically endangered Amur leopard. The last animal to be permanently rehomed was a bobcat named Blob, to The Big Cat Sanctuary in July 2025.

Independent of the criminal charges, the Cat Survival Trust was the subject of an inquiry by the Charity Commission for England and Wales in January 2024. The organisation had not submitted accounts for 11 years.
