= Giles Clark =

English conservationist and TV presenter

Giles Clark (born 1978) is an English conservationist and TV presenter. He worked with big cats at Australia Zoo from 2003 to 2016, before becoming a director at The Big Cat Sanctuary in Kent. He has presented the documentary series Tigers About the House (2014), Big Cats About the House (2018) and Bears About the House (2020).

== Biography ==
Clark grew up in London, in a house with many domestic cats, piquing his interest in big cats. When he was 14, he did work experience at Paradise Wildlife Park (now Hertfordshire Zoo).

In 2003, Clark set up a tiger facility at Australia Zoo in Queensland. He was a friend of its owner Steve Irwin, who died in a stingray attack in 2006. In 2014, he made his television debut in the BBC's Tigers About the House, in which he raised Sumatran tiger cubs Spot and Stripe in his house after their mother rejected them; the series ran for three episodes with two follow-up episodes later in the year. Having socialised with the tigers since their infancy, he was able to take ultrasound or blood samples, acts that would usually have to be done under anaesthetic. In 2016, he co-presented the four episodes of Ingenious Animals, another BBC programme.

Clark returned to England in late 2016 and became director of cats and conservation at The Big Cat Sanctuary in Kent, under the same ownership as Paradise Wildlife Park. He brought the BBC to make a documentary about the site; during filming, a five-day-old black jaguar cub named Maya was sent to the sanctuary due to rejection from her mother. The previous footage was scrapped and the documentary was reframed as Big Cats About the House, with Clark raising Maya in his house. Clark fed Maya every two hours and took her to practice swimming and appear on BBC Breakfast, before leaving her to an independent life around her first birthday.

In July 2020, Clark presented the BBC's programme Bears About the House, narrated by Andrew Lincoln. The series highlighted the illegal trade in sun bears and moon bears in Laos. The first episode focuses on a sun bear called Mary whom Clark helps raise after she was rescued by Free the Bears Fund. The second episodes continued to follow the bears as they were rehabilitated.

In 2020, Clark was involved in setting up a new state of the art tiger enclosure and announced plans for a new exhibit for Sun Bears at Paradise Wildlife Park.

In July 2025, Clark was awarded an honorary doctorate in science from the University of Kent.
