= Herpetarium =

Zoological exhibition for reptiles and amphibians

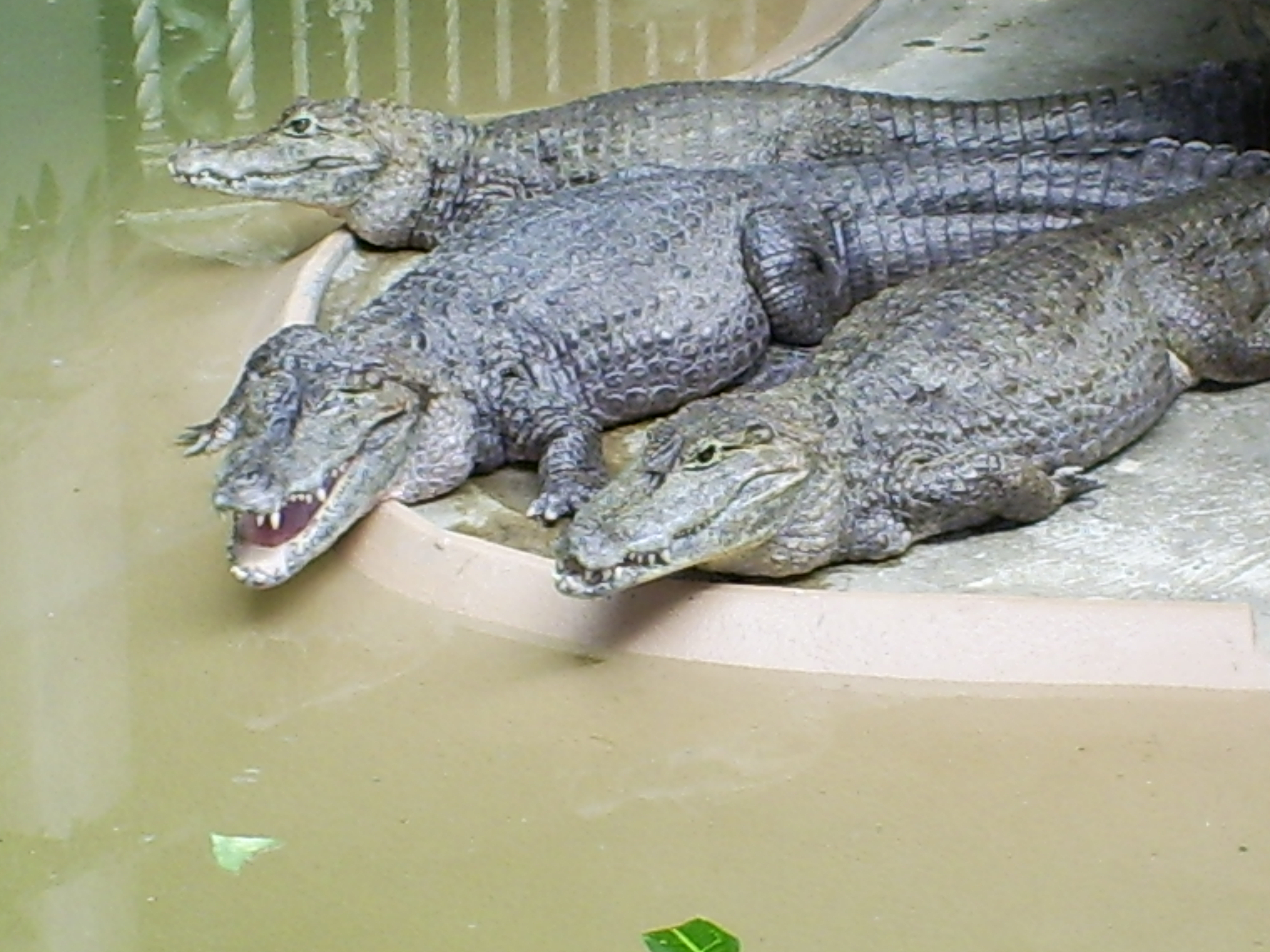
Spectacled caimans (Caiman crocodilus) at the Herpetarium in Saint Louis Zoological Park.

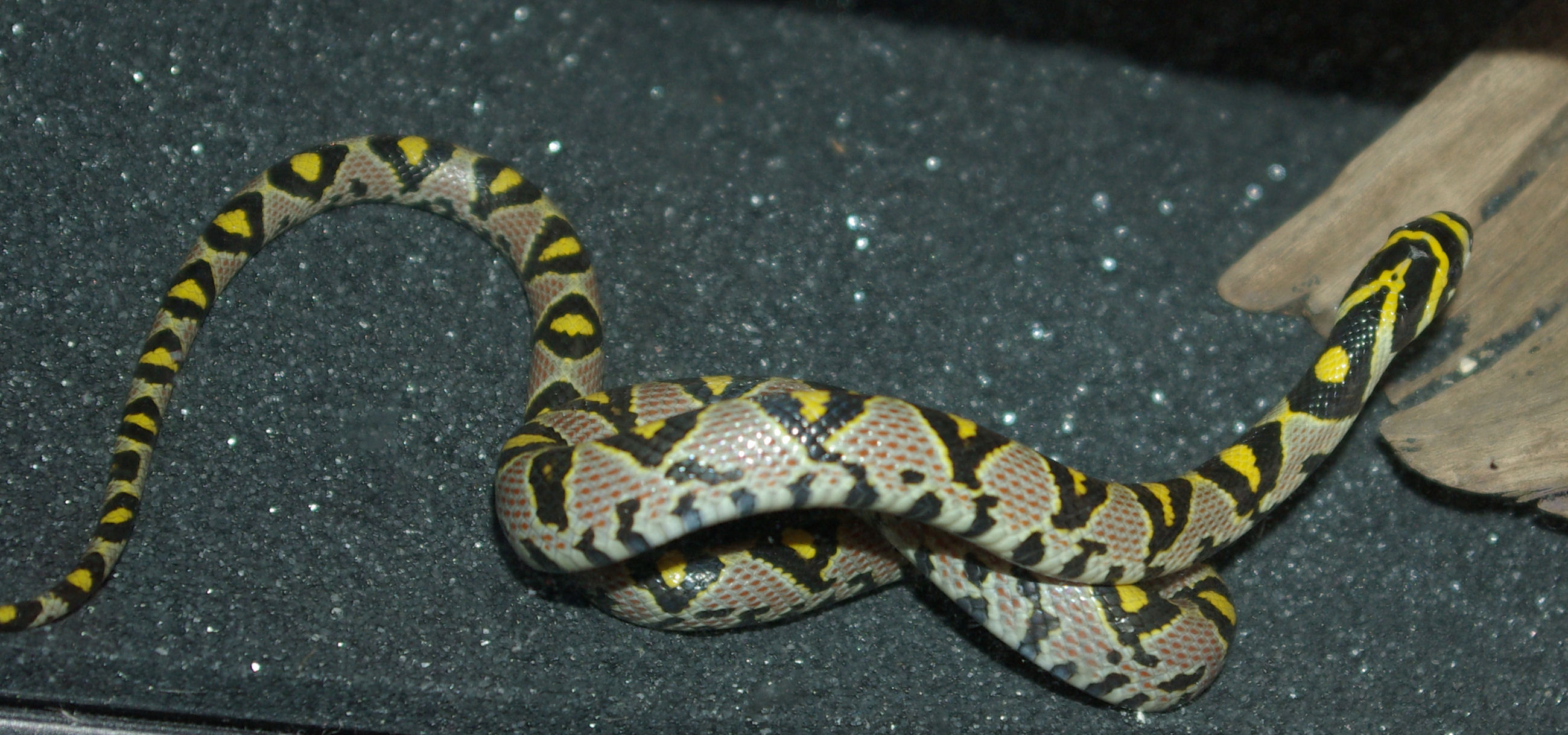
Euprepiophis in a Serpentarium

A herpetarium is a zoological exhibition space for reptiles and amphibians, most commonly a dedicated area of a larger zoo. A herpetarium which specializes in snakes is an ophidiarium or serpentarium, which are more common as stand-alone entities also known as snake farms. Many snake farms milk snakes for venom for medical and scientific research.

== Notable herpetariums ==
- Alice Springs Reptile Centre in Alice Springs, Australia
- Alligator Bay (zoo) in Beauvoir, France
- Armadale Reptile Centre in Perth, Australia
- Australian Reptile Park in Somersby, Australia
- Chennai Snake Park Trust in Chennai, India
- Crocodiles of the World in Brize Norton, UK
- Crocosaurus Cove in Darwin, Australia
- Clyde Peeling's Reptiland in Allenwood, Pennsylvania
- Kentucky Reptile Zoo in Slade, Kentucky
- The LAIR at the Los Angeles Zoo in Los Angeles, California
- Serpent Safari in Gurnee, Illinois
- Saint Louis Zoo Herpetarium in St. Louis, Missouri
- Staten Island Zoo Serpentarium in New York City, New York
- World of Reptiles at the Bronx Zoo in New York City, New York

== See also ==
- Herpetoculture
- Bill Haast (founder of Miami Serpentarium)
