= Exmoor Zoo =

Zoo in Exmoor, North Devon, England

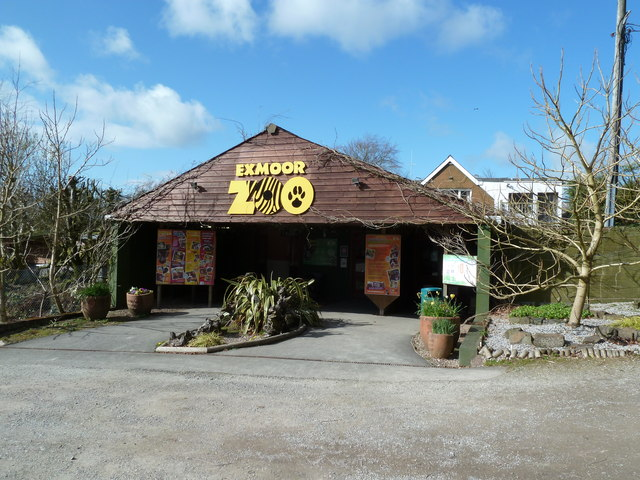
- Exmoor Zoo in 2013
- Interactive map of Exmoor Zoo
- 51.148°N 3.924°W
- Date opened: 1982
- Location: Bratton Fleming, Devon, England
- Memberships: BIAZA
- Website: exmoorzoo.co.uk

Exmoor Zoo is a conservation centre near Bratton Fleming in Exmoor, a national park in North Devon, England. The zoo developed from Exmoor Bird Gardens, opened on the site of a farm in 1982. The current owners took over in 1993, and have enlarged and developed the zoo, now specialising in the conservation of smaller animals. The zoo has been a member of the British and Irish Association of Zoos and Aquariums (BIAZA), since 1995 and became a member of the European Association of Zoos and Aquariums (EAZA) in 2018.

== History ==
Exmoor Bird Gardens opened on a 7-acre (2.8 ha) site in 1982, which expanded to 12 acres (4.9 ha) in 1985. It was sold in 1987 at the peak of the property market, but suffered financial difficulties after Black Monday until it was placed in receivership in 1992. This led to a change of ownership in April 1993, and the new owners started refurbishing the run-down bird gardens, also adding a number of animal species to the attractions. However, in May 1993 a gang of thieves stole 25 marmosets and tamarins and 4 pairs of parrots.

The zoo started with only two staff and about 10,000 visitors. Many of the trees and shrubs still growing were first planted in 1994 and 1995. The 1995 name change to Exmoor Animal & Bird Gardens coincided with the joining of BIAZA. A further name change to "Exmoor Zoological Park" took place in 1997, although this has since been shortened to just "Exmoor Zoo". Since then the zoo has expanded and developed further, and the focus has started shifting towards exhibiting larger animals than previously.

The African Café, reptiles area and souvenirs area were built in 2003, followed by the cheetah and maned wolf enclosures in Winter 2004. The Howler monkey exhibit and tortoise house were built in 2006, with the development of the Exmoor Beast exhibit in 2007.

== Animal overview ==
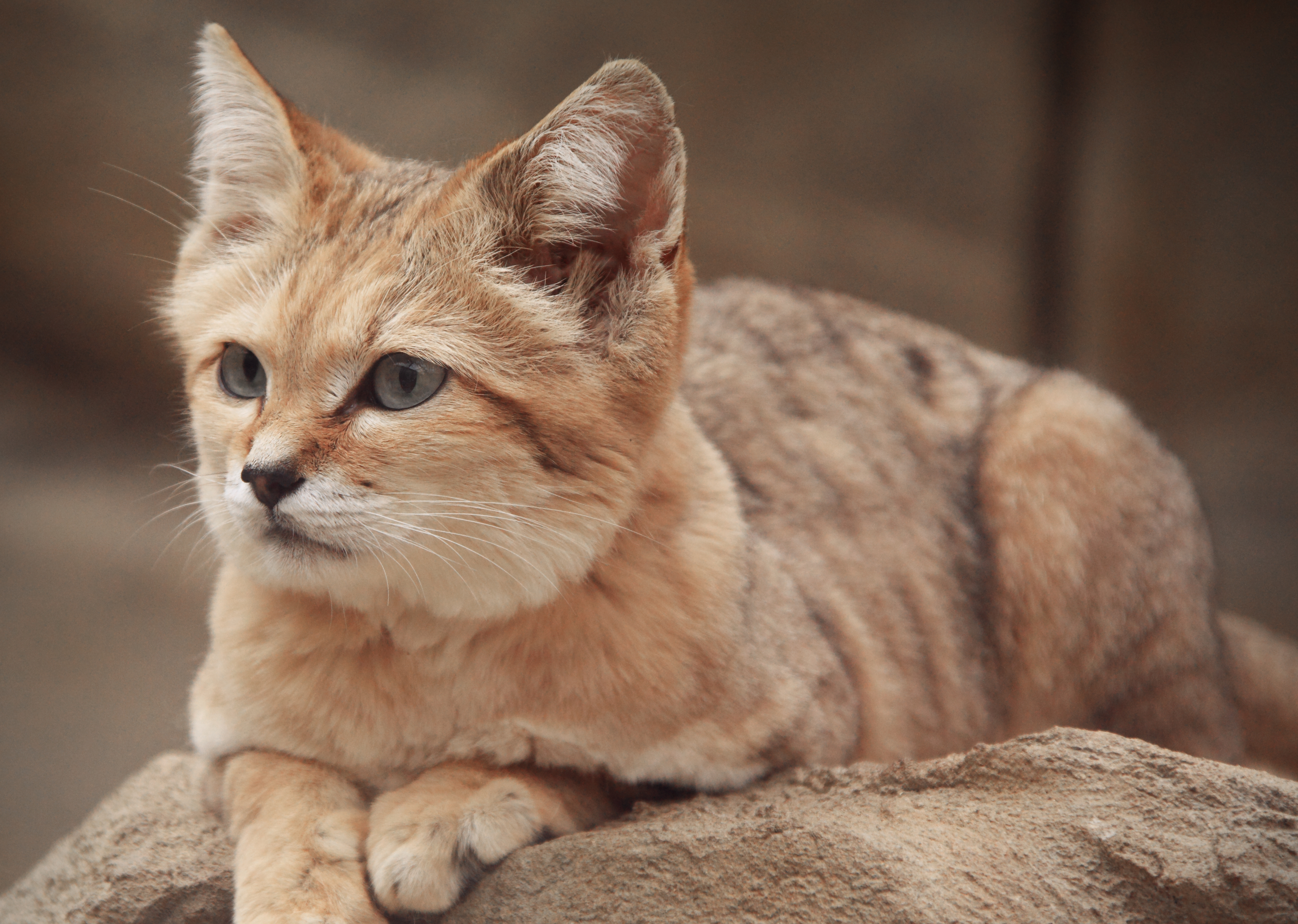
Sand cat at the Exmoor Zoo

Exmoor Zoo cares for 175 species of animals, birds and reptiles. Many extremely rare captive species are exhibited such as Malagasy civets, margays, New Guinea singing dogs, rusty-spotted cats and yellow-throated martens.

=== Mammals ===
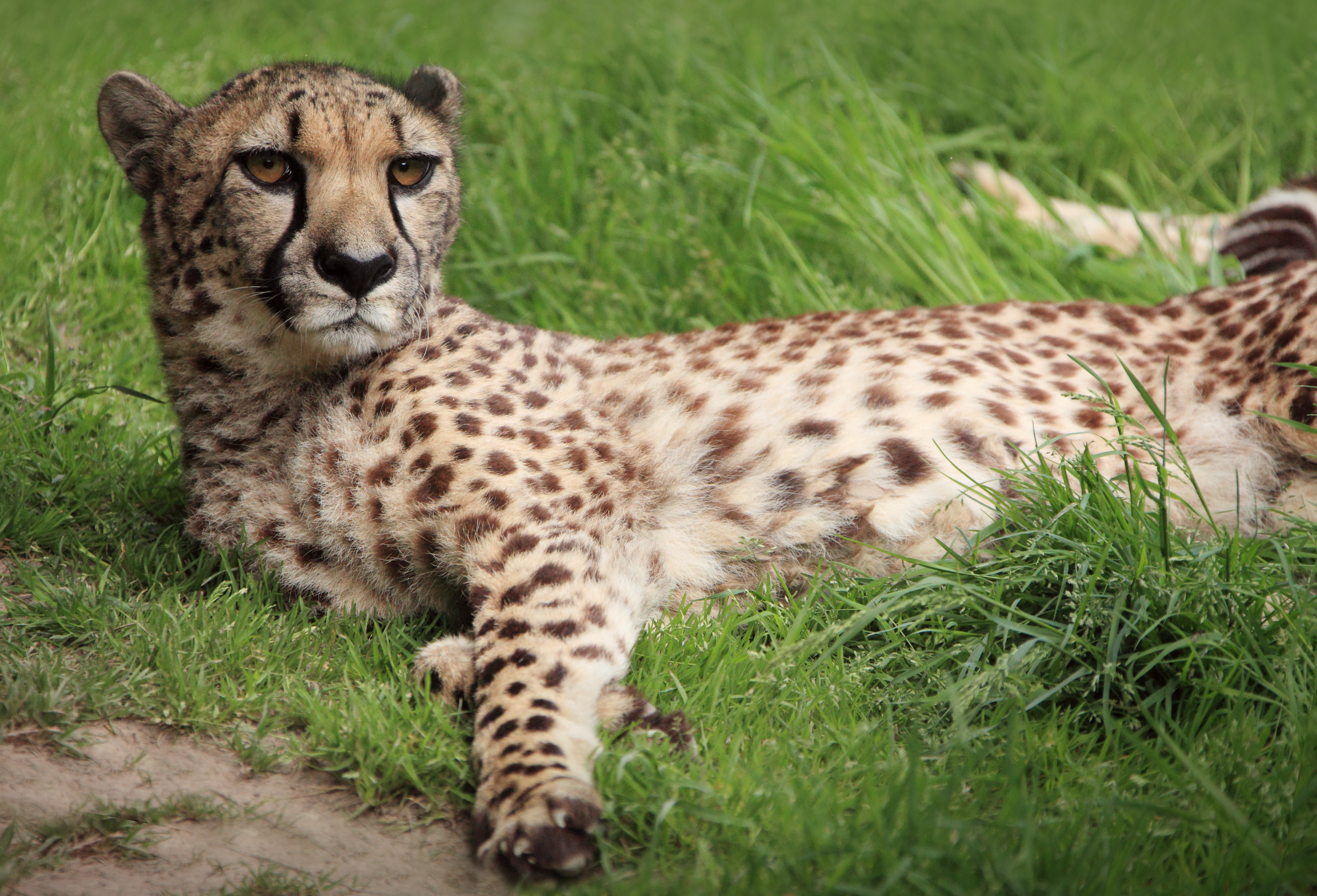
Cheetah stretching at the Exmoor Zoo

Among the larger residents are cheetahs, maned wolves, pumas, Eurasian wolves, African wild dogs, South American tapirs, reindeer and sitatungas. The zoo is also home to a significant number of species of smaller carnivores like bat-eared foxes, binturongs, bush dogs, caracals, Carpathian lynxes, fishing cats, jaguarundis, ringtails, sand cats, servals, tayras and wolverines.

One of the zoo's feature attractions, the enclosure for the "Exmoor Beast", was completed in January 2007 when Ebony arrived, a melanistic leopard (or black panther) thought to be one of only two in the British Isles available for breeding. The zoo received a male black panther as a potential mate for Ebony in December 2009. Zoysa came from Linton Zoo, Cambridgeshire on breeding loan, but is now at the zoo permanently. Ebony died on 22 October 2020, leaving Zoysa as the zoo's only leopard, until his own death on 18 October 2022.

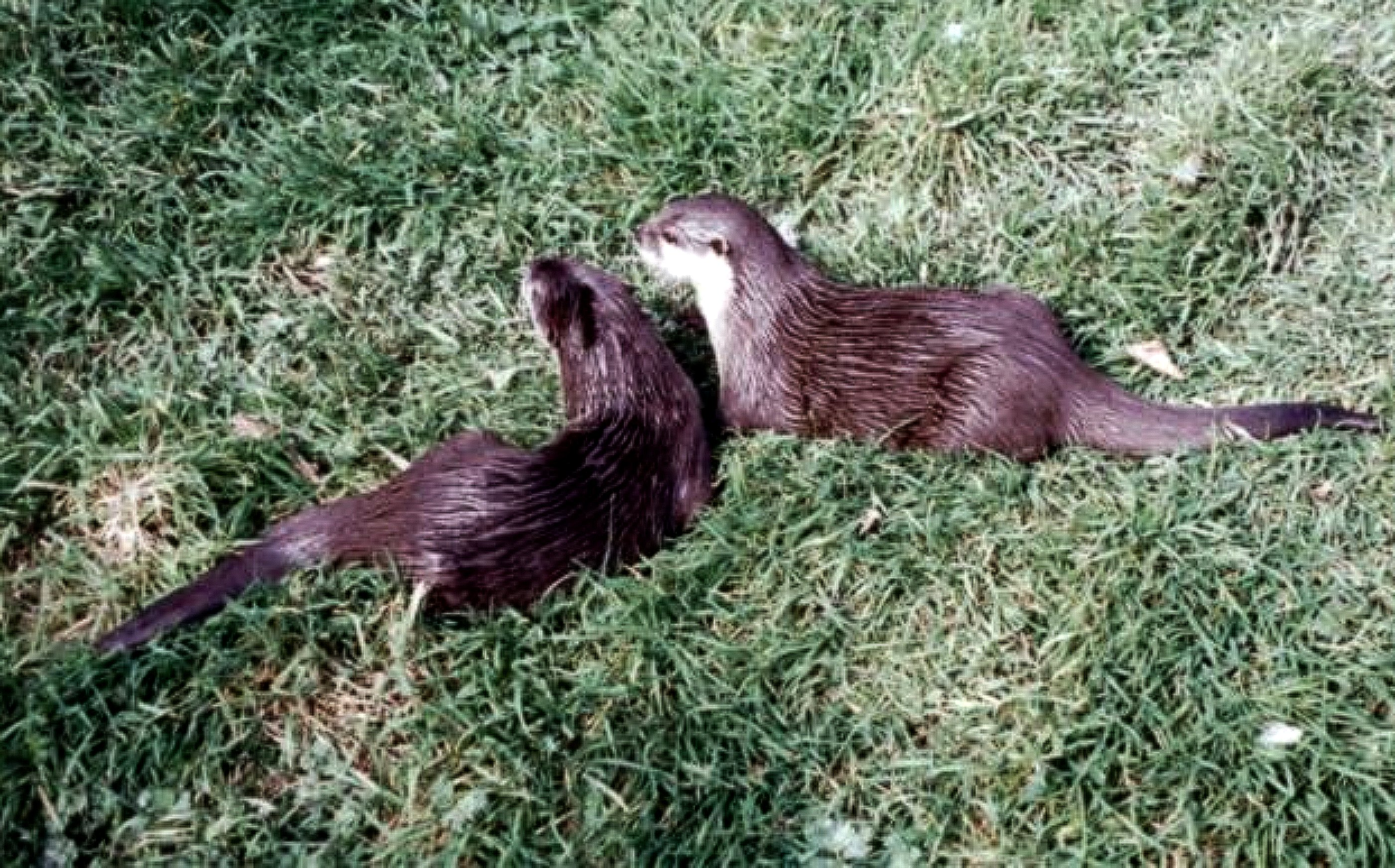
Otters at Exmoor Zoo

Other mammals in the zoo's collection include alpacas, Azara's agoutis, black-and-white ruffed lemurs, capybaras, Colombian spider monkeys, dusky pademelons, eastern grey kangaroos, lar gibbons, long-nosed potoroos, meerkats, North American porcupines, Patagonian maras, red-necked wallabies red river hogs, ring-tailed lemurs, silvery marmosets and yellow-cheeked gibbons.

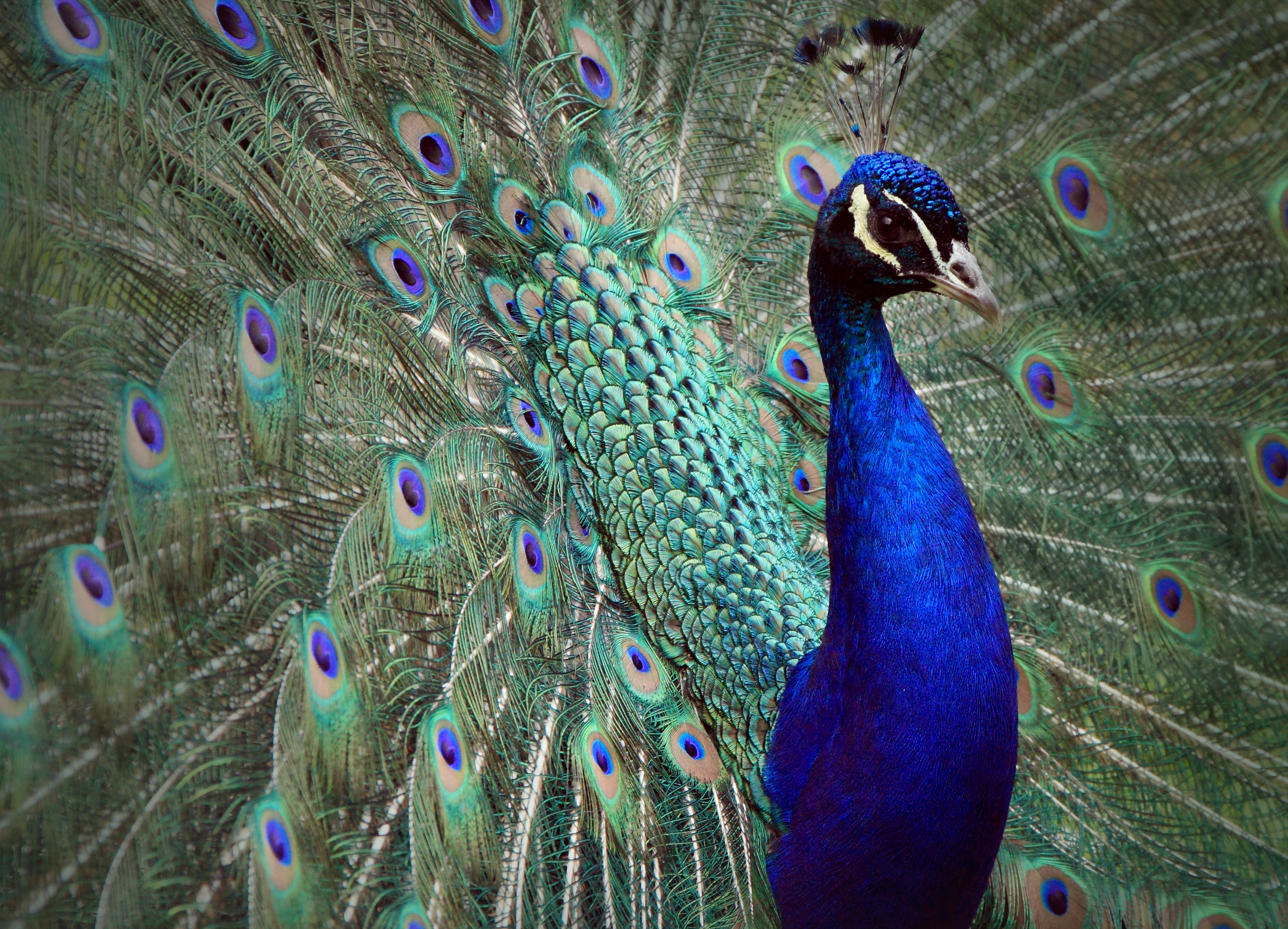
Peacock at the Exmoor Zoo

=== Birds ===
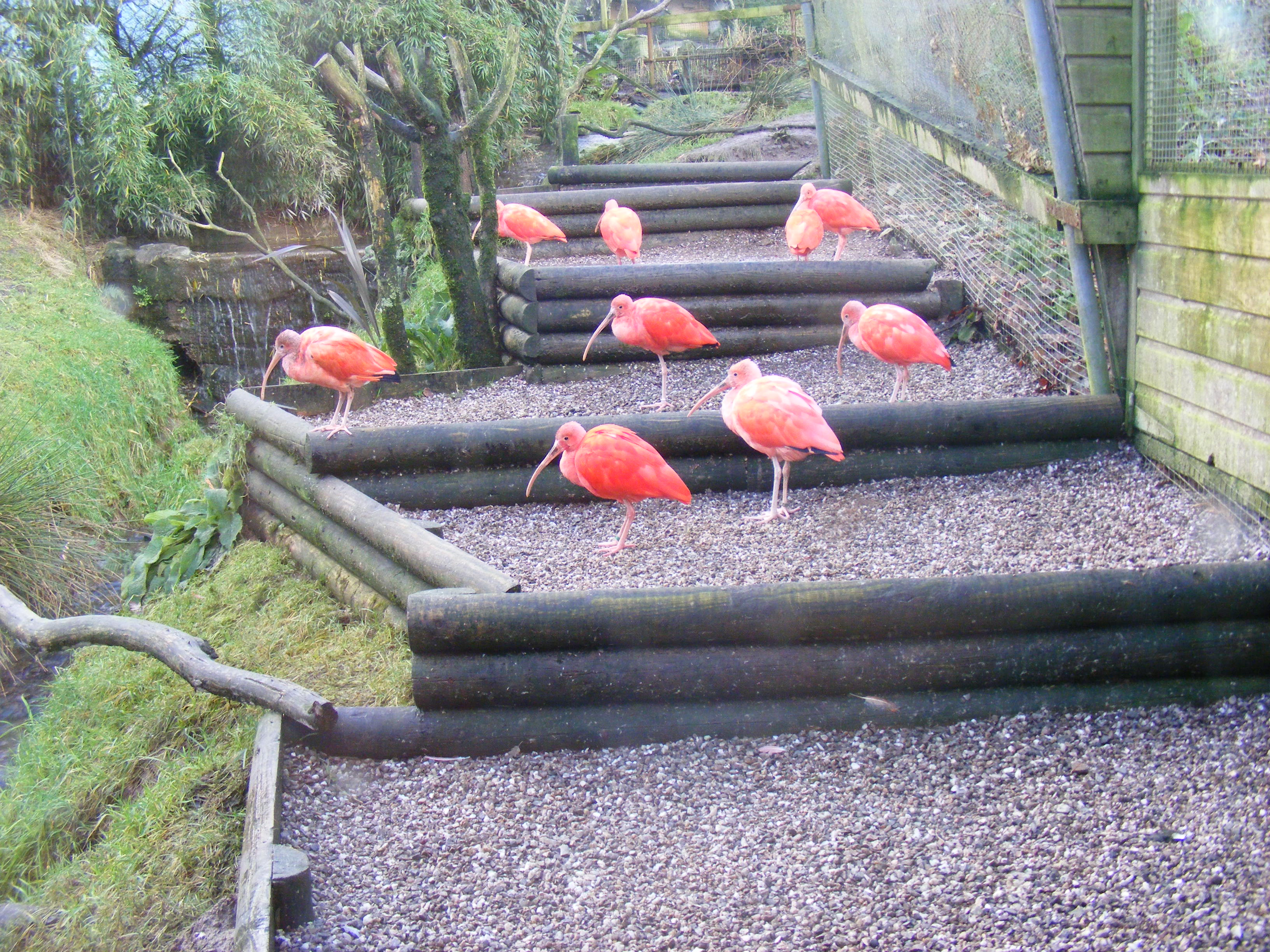
Scarlet ibises at the Exmoor Zoo

The zoo's collection of birds includes Abyssinian ground hornbills, American flamingos, black-crowned night herons, demoiselle cranes, festive amazons, great grey owls, greater rheas, grey crowned cranes, helmeted guineafowl, Orinoco geese, pale-mandibled aracaris, palm-nut vultures, pink-backed pelicans, red-crowned cranes, roseate spoonbills, scarlet ibises, a shoebill, southern bald ibises, vulturine guineafowl, white storks, yellow-billed storks and yellow-shouldered amazons.

== Conservation work ==
The zoo participates in international, European and national animal breeding programmes, and cooperates with other zoos around the world to exchange animals to ensure their survival.

The zoo was noted for its conservation work with tamarins and marmosets, and more recently, long-nosed potoroos and smaller carnivores.

== In the news ==
Thieves targeted the zoo in March 2006, stealing a number of endangered species. The entire colony of eleven black-tufted marmosets were stolen, the only breeding colony in Britain, wrecking 13 years of the zoo's attempts to protect the highly endangered animals. The thieves' haul also included a pair of white-fronted marmosets, a pair of cockatoos and a pair of amazon parrots. It is believed that the animals were stolen 'to order'. Two of the marmosets have since been recovered.

In September 2006 the zoo acquired a pair of howler monkeys, called Greeb and Wing, to act as a 'burglar alarm'. This move was prompted by the theft of the marmosets earlier in the year. The zookeepers are hoping that the noisy monkeys will be enough to scare off intruders.

In June 2006 a family of blackbirds nested in an artificial tree in the education centre, drawing attention from families visiting the zoo. A pair of albino skunks were born at the zoo in 2006.
