= Ponderosa Zoo =

Zoo in Heckmondwike, West Yorkshire, England

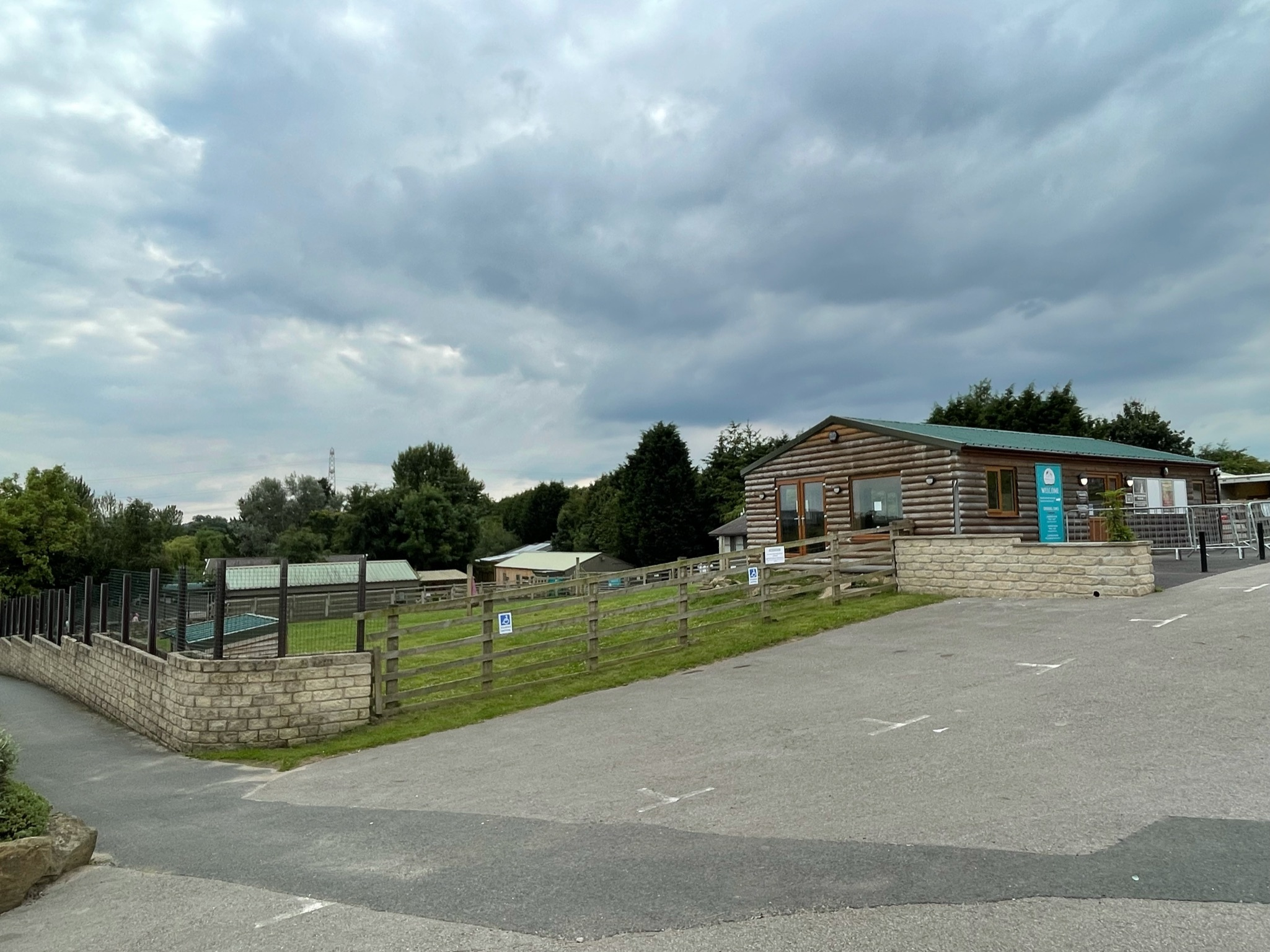
- Entrance and general view of the zoo.
- Interactive map of Ponderosa Zoo
- 53.6934°N 1.6709°W
- Slogan: "Helping to bridge the gap"
- Date opened: 1991
- Location: Heckmondwike West Yorkshire, England
- Land area: 11 acres (4.5 ha)
- No. of animals: 120
- Annual visitors: 200,000
- Memberships: BIAZA
- Website: https://ponderosa-zoo.co.uk/

Ponderosa Zoo is a zoo in Heckmondwike, West Yorkshire, England. It was originally opened in 1991 as the Ponderosa Rural Therapeutic Centre before being granted a zoo licence in 2004.

== History ==
=== Foundation and early years ===
In 1988, businessman Howard Cook MBE purchased a 50-acre (20 ha) neglected dairy farm in Heckmondwike, West Yorkshire. The farmland was considered poor quality with little use to the farmer and surrounding community so, in 1989, Cook began to redevelop it and used it as a base for his building company. Cook's family, which was associated with the learning disability charity Mencap, decided to use the farmland for the disabled and established the Ponderosa Rural Therapeutic Centre. A greenhouse and other facilities were built in collaboration with the Ravensthorpe Education Centre which allowed students to experience and develop their horticultural skills.

In 1991, Cook's wife, Maureen Cook (née Totton), developed the site further by introducing a rare breeds farm, named the Ponderosa Rare Breeds Farm, which was built upon a 7-acre (2.8 ha) landfill between two disused railway lines. By 2002, the centre had grown to house around 150 animals, including wallabies and water buffalo. Llamas, emus and deer also joined the collection after moving from a small zoo in Leigh, Greater Manchester. During the same year, the zoo received £13,000 in compensation due to a nationwide outbreak of foot-and-mouth disease which resulted in the centre closing for over two months. The money was used to build new attractions, including an enclosure for marmosets, a reptile house, an aquatic centre and two lakes. A zoo license was also applied for due to the increasing size of the zoo's animal collection, which was granted in 2004. In 2014, the zoo was put up for sale at a price of £1.3 million.

=== Recent ===
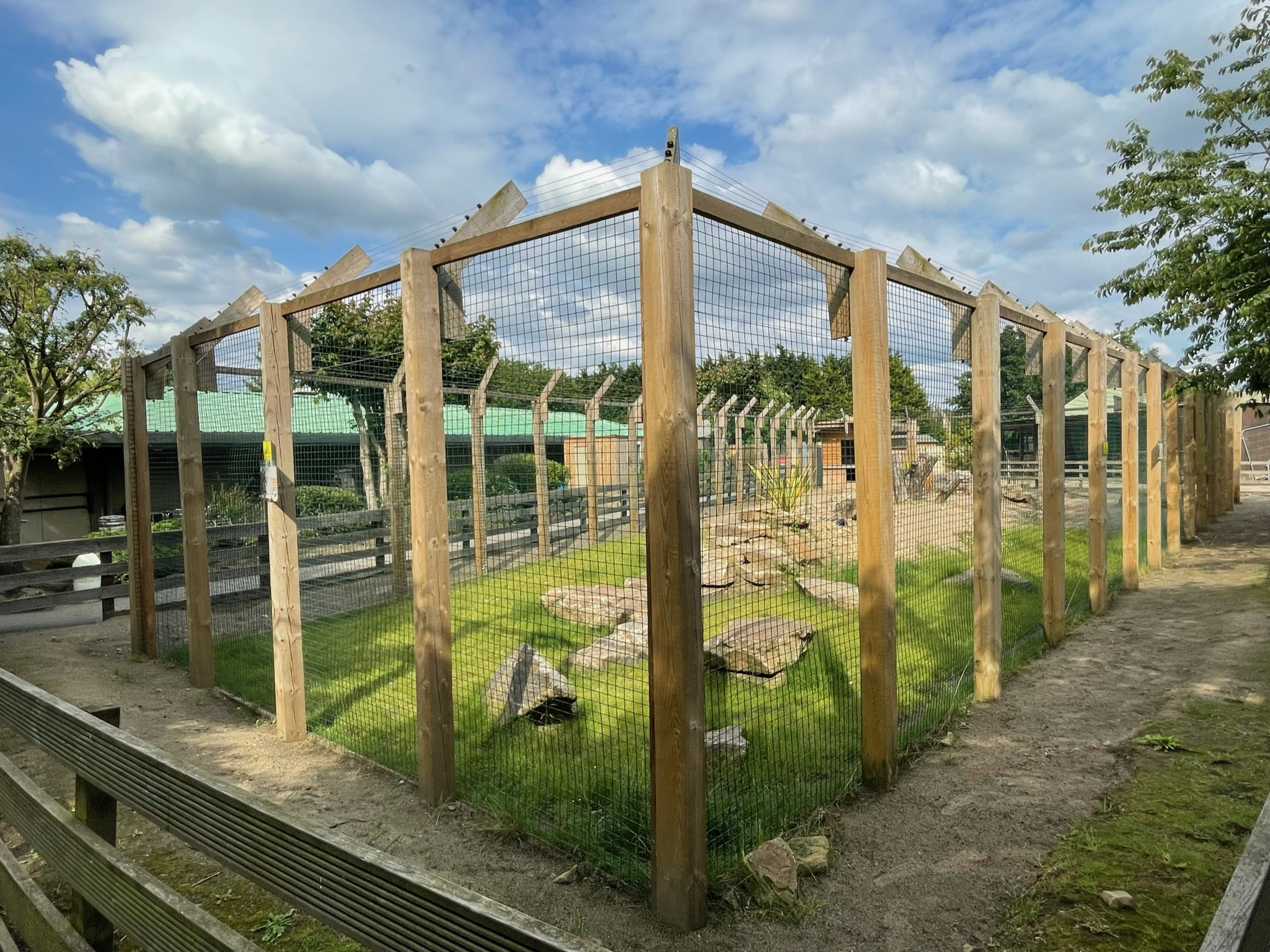
The serval enclosure.

In 2017, the centre became a provisional member of the British and Irish Association of Zoos and Aquariums and adopted the name Ponderosa Zoo. During the same year, it closed for several months to carry out planned refurbishments amid reports of poor animal welfare and mistreatment in the local press. Following an inspection, Kirklees Council subsequently concluded that standards had been met.

In March 2020, the zoo struggled financially following its temporary closure during the COVID-19 pandemic and turned to crowdfunding for donations. Its co-founder, Maureen Cook, also died in the following April. In June, the zoo was allowed to reopen to the public with COVID safety measures in place. In September, the zoo announced it was upgrading its security to allow for around-the-clock coverage on-site. Founder Howard Cook explained that this was due to vandalism which had previously resulted in escaping animals, which risked their welfare.

In 2021, the zoo became a full member of BIAZA, having previously being only a provisional member. In April 2021, the zoo also opened a new lemur walkthrough enclosure, named Lemur Lookout.

In March 2022, the zoo was the subject of a planning dispute with the local council.

On 4 October 2023, Ponderosa Zoo co-founder Howard Cook died aged 79 of lung and liver cancer. His son Adam announced that he would be continuing his father's work at Ponderosa.

== Overview ==
The zoo lies within an 80-acre (32 ha) plot of land off Smithies Lane in Heckmondwike, West Yorkshire. It is laid around a small lake and comprises various animal enclosures, a ticket office, cafe, lakeside restaurant, reptile house, adventure play area and guest amenities. The zoo's animal collection has gradually expanded since its beginnings in 1991 as a "rare breeds farm" with Highland cattle, llamas, wallabies and emus. As of 5 May 2020, the zoo's collection of over 120 animals includes serval, Scottish wildcats, lemurs, reindeer, coati, otters and raccoon dogs, plus various birds, reptiles and small invertebrates. Prior to becoming a zoo, the centre's founding mission was to "bridge the gap" between disabled and able-bodied people through using animals as a form of therapy. However, today, the zoo's mission also includes educating people on conservation.
