= Beauvoir, Manche =

Beauvoir
- Commune
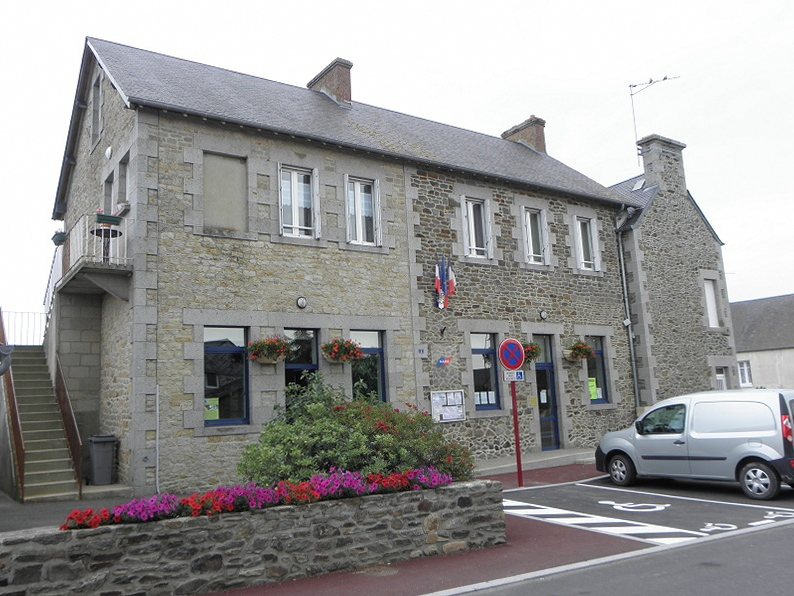
- The town hall
- Location of Beauvoir
- Location within France Location within Normandy
- Coordinates: 48°35′53″N 1°30′12″W
- Country: France
- Region: Normandy
- Department: Manche
- Arrondissement: Avranches
- Canton: Pontorson
- Intercommunality: CA Mont-Saint-Michel-Normandie

Government
  - Mayor (2020–2026): Alexis Sanson
- Area^{1}: 14.29 km^{2} (5.52 sq mi)
- Highest elevation: 40 m (130 ft)
- Lowest elevation: 5 m (16 ft)
- Population (2023): 419
  - Density: 29.3/km^{2} (75.9/sq mi)
- Time zone: UTC+01:00 (CET)
  - Summer (DST): UTC+02:00 (CEST)
- INSEE/Postal code: 50042 /50170
- ^{1} French Land Register data, which excludes lakes, ponds, glaciers > 1 km^{2} (0.386 sq mi or 247 acres) and river estuaries.

Beauvoir (French pronunciation: [bovwaʁ]) is a commune in the Manche department in the Normandy region in northwestern France. Andrés de Santa Cruz died there in 1865.

== Population ==
Historical population
Year	Pop.	±% p.a.
1968	433	—
1975	411	−0.74%
1982	420	+0.31%
1990	426	+0.18%
1999	427	+0.03%
2007	419	−0.24%
2012	420	+0.05%
2017	423	+0.14%
2023	419	−0.16%
Source: INSEE

== Points of interest ==
- Alligator Bay is a zoo covering 10 hectares that was established in 1994. It features over 800 animals, and 100 different species of reptiles.

== See also ==
- Communes of the Manche department
