= Northumberland College Zoo =

Zoo in Ponteland, Northumberland

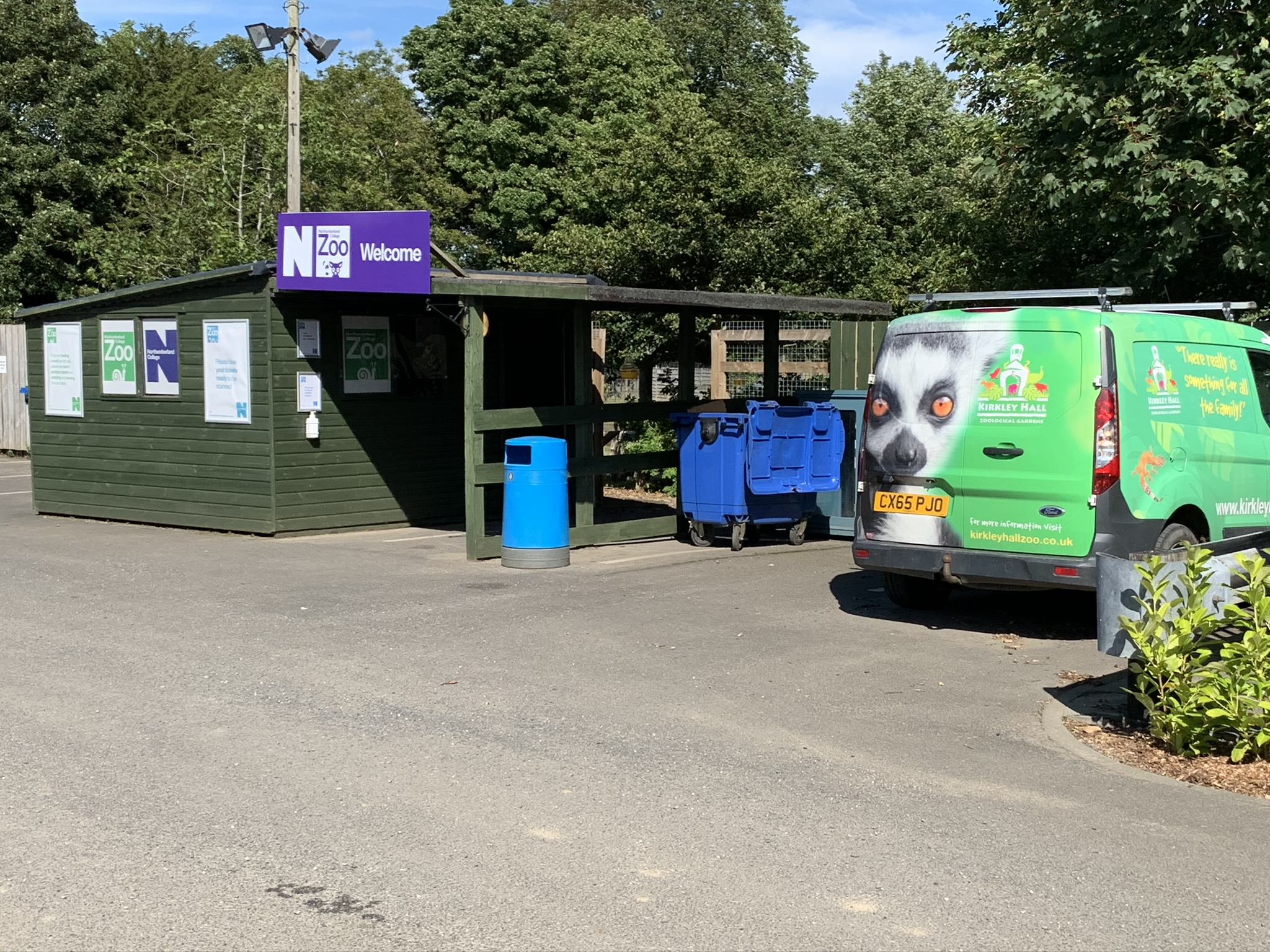
- Interactive map of Northumberland College Zoo
- 55°5′21.2″N 1°45′58.94″W
- Date opened: 26 May 2011
- Location: Ponteland, Northumberland, England
- No. of species: Over 200
- Memberships: BIAZA
- Website: https://www.northumberland.ac.uk/for-visitors/northumberland-college-zoo/

Northumberland College Zoo is a zoo located in Ponteland, Northumberland. Based within the 400-acre (160 ha) Kirkley Hall College campus, which is also shared with Kirkley Hall, the site is home to over 200 species and is managed by Northumberland College. It has been a member of the British and Irish Association of Zoos and Aquariums (BIAZA) since 2012.

== History ==
The zoo first opened as a visitor attraction in May 2011 as the Kirkley Hall Zoological Gardens. Prior to this, the site had been used solely as an educational training facility by Northumberland College for its animal care students. Its animal collection initially consisted of emus, wallabies, marmosets, lemurs and meerkats, among other species.

In 2012, the zoo joined the British and Irish Association of Zoos and Aquariums (BIAZA) and two red-crowned cranes from Chester Zoo were among the first animals the zoo received as a result of this membership. In 2016, the zoo applied for membership of the European Association of Zoos and Aquaria (EAZA), however was denied.

In July 2020, the zoo changed its name to Northumberland College Zoo.

== Overview ==
The zoo is situated within a 400-acre (160 ha) Northumberland College campus, which is also shared with Kirkley Hall. It is used solely as an educational training facility for students enrolled on animal care courses, except on weekends, bank holidays and school holidays when it also opens as a visitor attraction. The zoo houses over 200 species, including meerkats, raccoon dogs, bush dogs, binturongs (bearcats), Asian palm civets, small primates, fish, birds and reptiles.
