= Alligator Bay (zoo) =

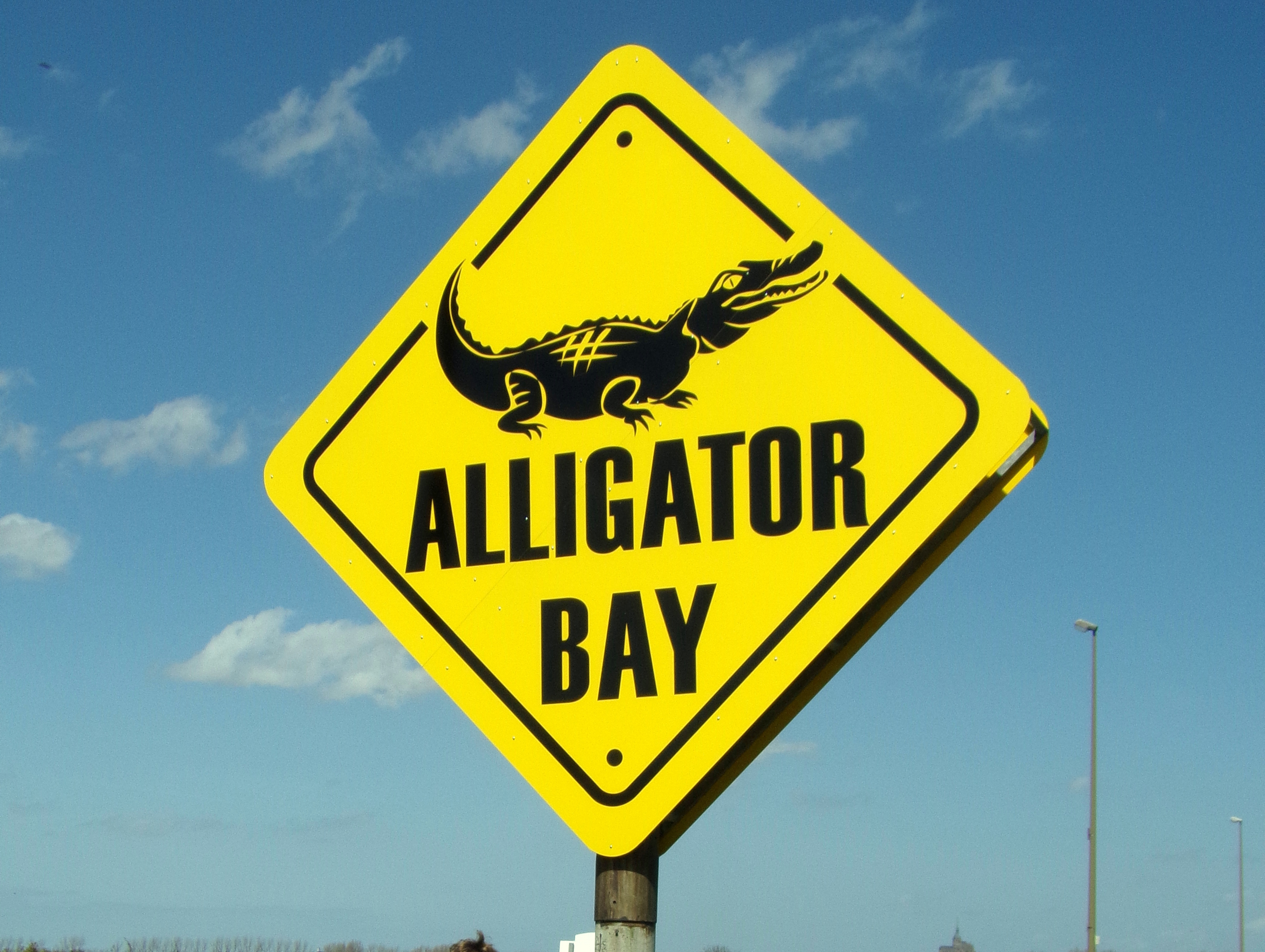

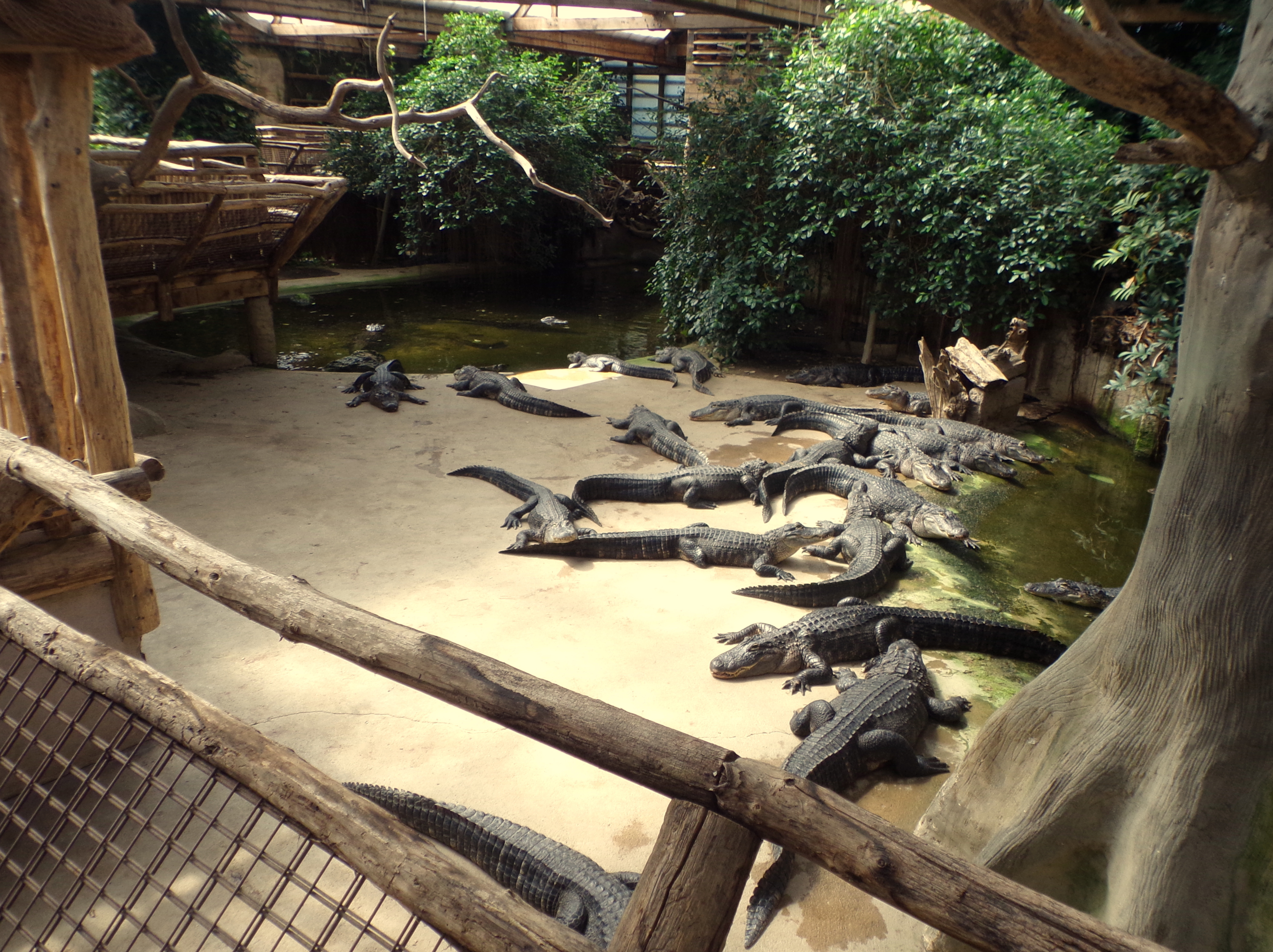
- The Mississippi Alligator display
- Interactive map of Alligator Bay
- 48°35′50″N 1°30′17″W
- Date opened: 1994
- Location: Beauvoir, France
- Land area: 10 hectares
- No. of animals: 1000
- No. of species: 100
- Annual visitors: 115,000
- Owner: Jean-Pierre Macé
- Website: www.alligator-bay.com/en/

Alligator Bay is a zoological park, Herpetarium, in the commune of Beauvoir, specialising in Reptiles.

The park covers an area of 10 hectares (25 acres). It is home to about 1000 animals, and features around 100 species.

It receives approximately 115,000 visitors per year.

== History ==
The zoo opened in 1994 by owner Jean-Pierre Macé, a Terrarium enthusiast who decided to build a permanent reptilarium.
