= The Big Cat Sanctuary =

English animal sanctuary

The Big Cat Sanctuary is an animal sanctuary in Smarden, Kent, England. It was founded by Peter Sampson in 2000. Due to big cats preferring to avoid humans, the site is only open to the general public for a few days per year, otherwise being open for experience packages.

The sanctuary has featured on television documentaries such as Big Cats About the House with director of conservation Giles Clark, and One Zoo Three on CBBC. The site has been involved in the rehoming of big cats from unsuitable environments, such as several cats from a closed-down sanctuary, and five lions taken from the war in Ukraine.

== History ==
The Big Cat Sanctuary was founded as a charitable organisation by Peter Sampson in 2000.

In 2016, Giles Clark joined the sanctuary as director of cats and conservation, moving from Australia Zoo having done work experience at the sanctuary's partner, Hertfordshire Zoo. Clark had presented Tigers About the House on the BBC in 2014, in which he raised two rejected tiger cubs at his home in Australia. He organised for the corporation to film a similar series for the sanctuary, Big Cats About the House, in which he raised a rejected jaguar cub named Maya before moving her to the sanctuary.

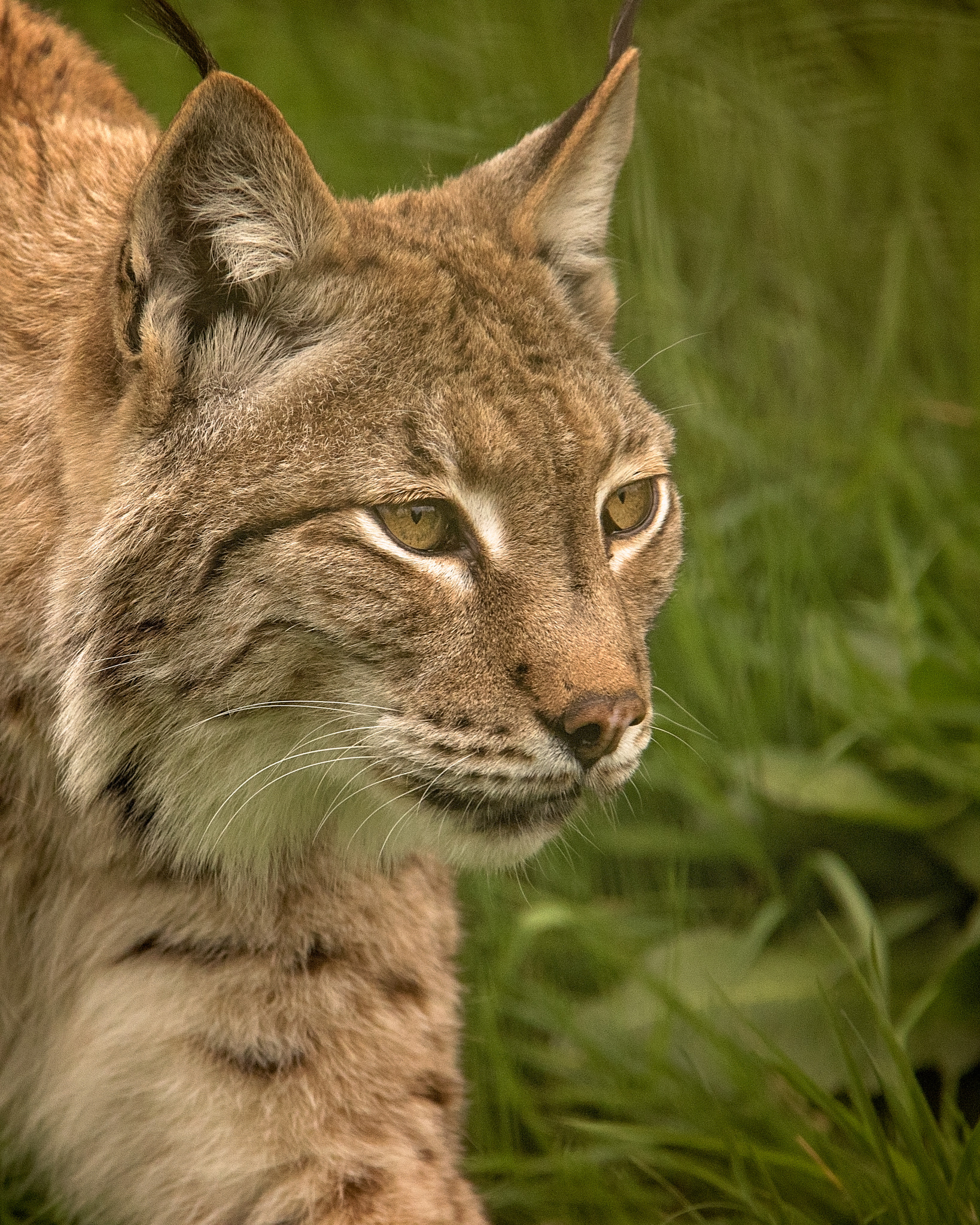
Petra, a Eurasian lynx who was the oldest animal at the sanctuary, dying at age 21 in 2024. She had previously been an animal actor.

The site had to organise fundraisers for its survival in 2020, as the COVID-19 pandemic caused visits to be cancelled. Celebrity baker Paul Hollywood, resident in Smarden, joined as an ambassador to encourage donations. Hollywood has provided recipes to the sanctuary's catering.

In 2021, the CBBC series One Zoo Three, documenting the Big Cat Sanctuary and Hertfordshire Zoo, was announced for broadcast the following year.

The Big Cat Sanctuary and Hertfordshire Zoo were involved in the rehoming of 28 cats from the Cat Survival Trust in Welwyn, whose owner was convicted of neglect in 2024. The cats included the UK's only Asian golden cat, and a critically endangered Amur leopard.

In 2024, the sanctuary began a fundraiser to raise £500,000 to evacuate a male lion and four lionesses from Kyiv, Ukraine. The animals had been affected by post-traumatic stress disorder from the Russian invasion. The five cats all reached the sanctuary by March 2025, and experienced grass for the first time, having previously lived in concrete exhibits or in private homes.

A staff member was hospitalised in 2024 after having a fingertip bitten off while feeding a Siberian tiger. The staff member acknowledged "complacency" and having cut the chunk of meat too small. Refresher training was then provided to all staff.

== Features ==
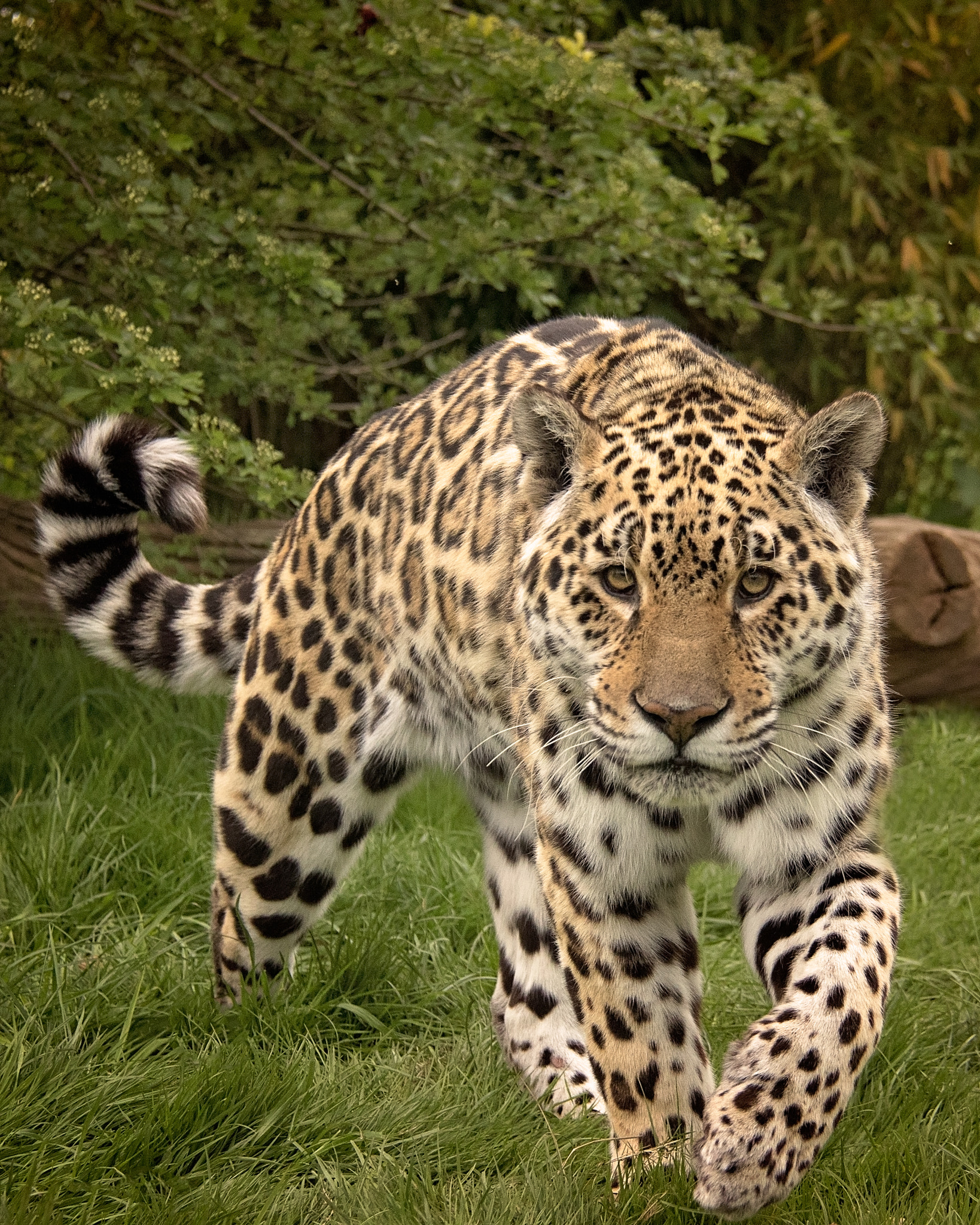
A jaguar in its enclosure

As most cats avoid humans, the Big Cat Sanctuary is not run like a traditional zoo, and instead is open for purchasers of packages such as overnight stays and photography workshops. Tours and workshops are often limited to six guests, out of respect to the animals. It runs a small number of open days per year, from which some cats hide. As of 2018, the open days provided 25% of its funds.

In 2018, Clark said that the operating cost of the sanctuary was £1 million. He highlighted that big cats live longer in captivity, and suffer illnesses that do not occur in the wild. In the same year, the site contributed £20,000 to global conservation, such as collars to track wild jaguars. Clark said in 2017 that a strategy to aid endangered species should be to protect wild populations, rather than breed and release captive cats.

Enclosures are designed to match wild habitats, such as having large spaces for lions and cheetahs to roam, and opportunities for jaguars and leopards to climb. Marmite is applied to trees to imitate the scent of other animals.

The sanctuary had 50 cats of 15 species, across 40 enclosures, in 2018. In winter, they eat around 800 kilograms of food per week. Cats are fed three times a week, imitating their wild pattern of big meals days apart, and are encouraged to search out their meal.
