= Lakeland Wildlife Oasis =

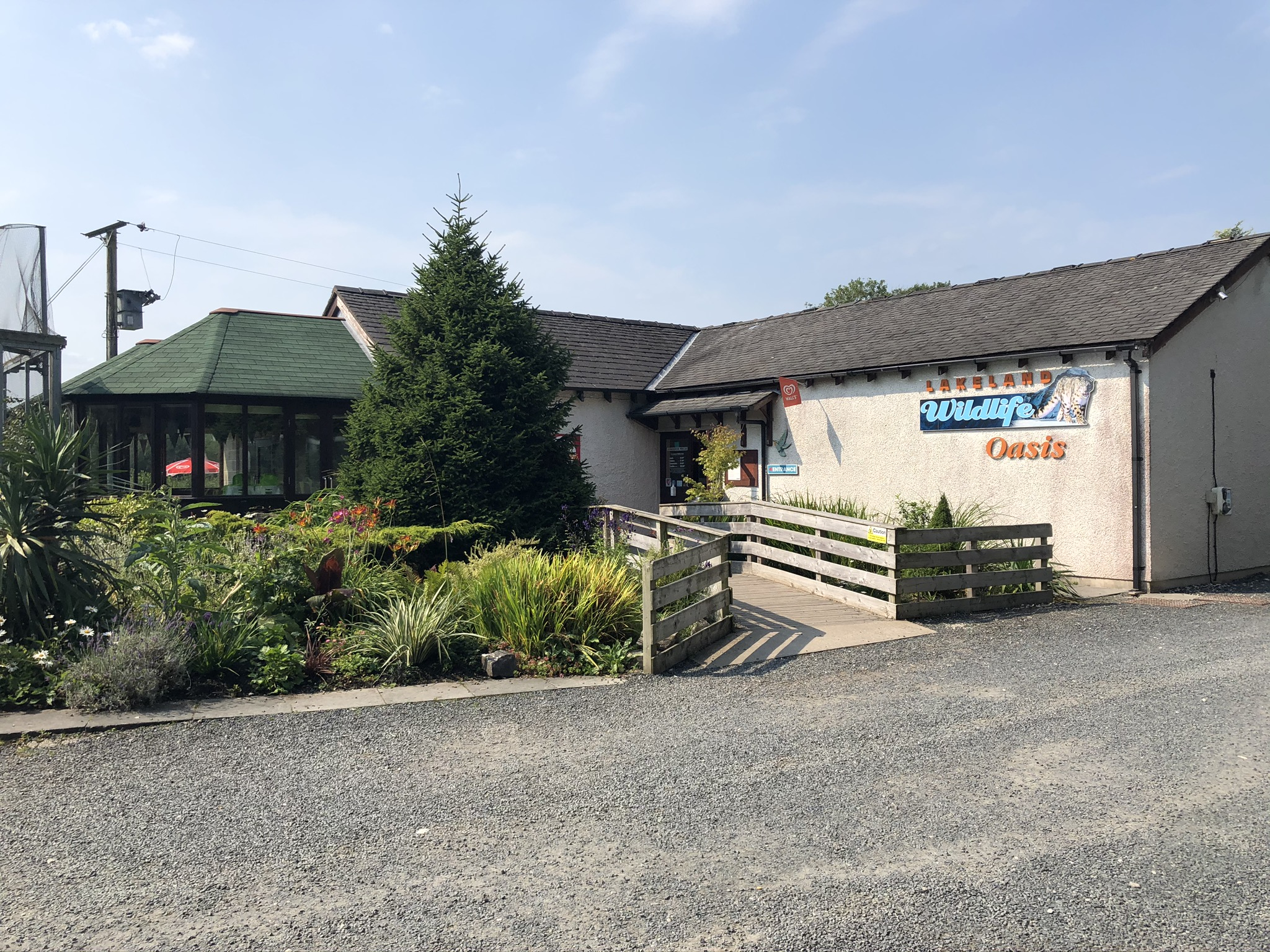
- Entrance
- Interactive map of Lakeland Wildlife Oasis
- 54.1931°N 2.7536°W
- Slogan: The little zoo with lots to do
- Date opened: 14 April 1992
- Location: Milnthorpe, Cumbria, England
- Land area: 3 acres (1.2 ha)
- No. of species: Over 100
- Memberships: BIAZA
- Website: https://wildlifeoasis.co.uk/

The Lakeland Wildlife Oasis is a small zoological collection near the town of Milnthorpe, Cumbria, England, with a science and evolution theme. Since April 2012 the zoo has been run by the registered charity Lakeland Trust for Natural Sciences.

== History ==
The zoo first opened to the public on 14 April 1992 as a "part-zoo, part-museum". It featured a butterfly hall, aquarium and tropical hall which were home to common marmosets, brown rats, fish, amphibians, reptiles and invertebrates. The zoo expanded over the years and, in 2011, acquired its first snow leopard, a male named Pavan, for which it had built an enclosure with a perspex walk-through tunnel, reportedly the UK's first walk-through big cat exhibit. Pavan was soon followed by a female named Tara. These produced two young during 2014, which were named Loki and Luna, the first successful snow leopard breeding recorded in the North of England.

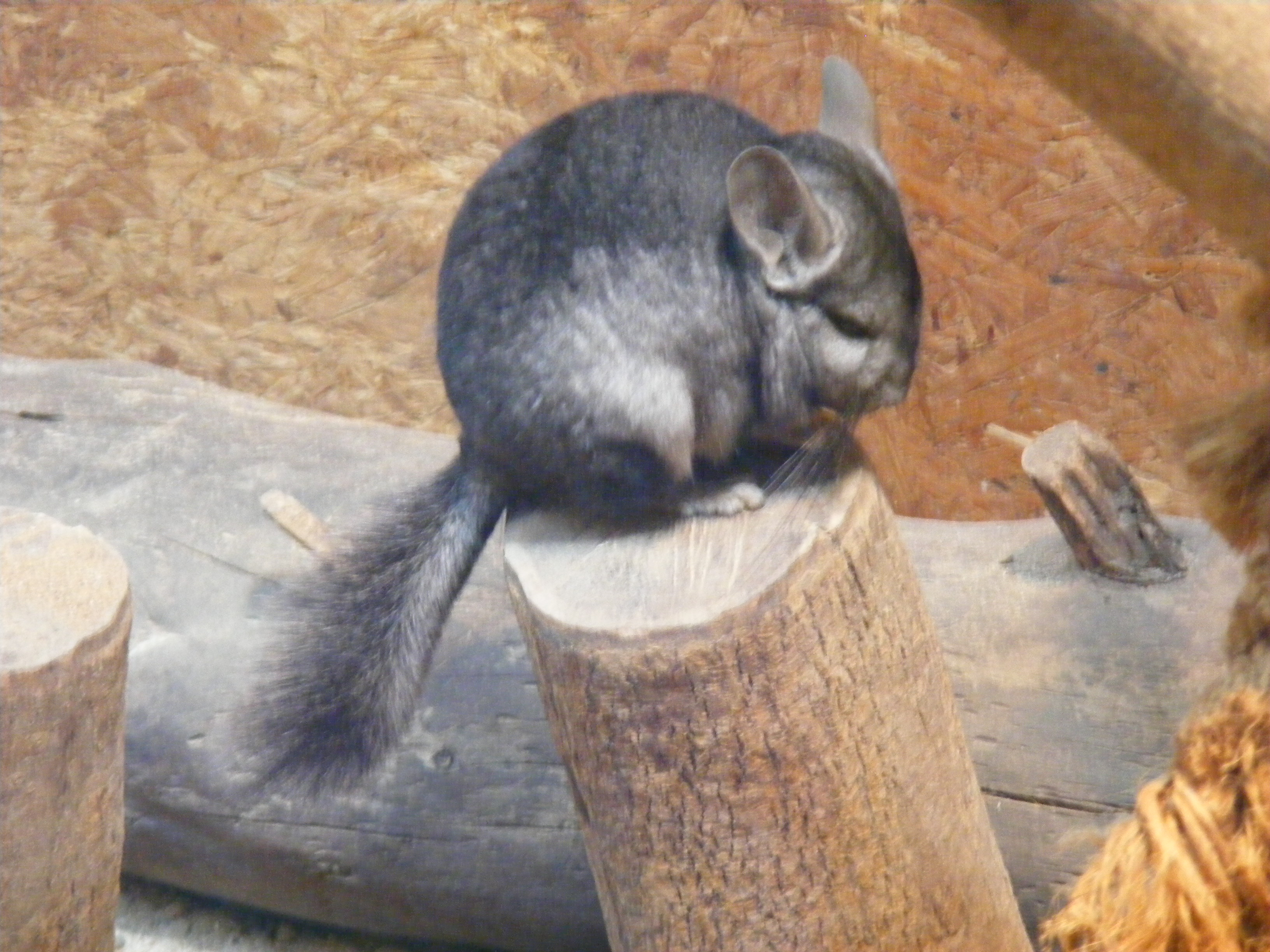
Chinchilla

In 2015, the zoo closed to the public after it was hit by severe flooding during Storm Desmond. Many animals were able to reach raised areas, whilst others, including pheasants and Azara's agoutis, were moved to safety. With a lack of visitor revenue, the zoo turned to crowdfunding for donations with the money to be used for repairing damage and upgrading the flood proofing of animal enclosures.

== Overview ==
The 3-acre (1.2 ha) centre is divided into several sections, including a butterfly house, tropical hall and aquarium, as well as outdoor enclosures. Its layout is designed to take visitors on an evolutionary journey, beginning with marine life, amphibians, reptiles, birds and then mammals. Over 100 species are on display, including fossa, snow leopards, fruit bats, meerkats, armadillos, red squirrels, lemurs, marmosets, roul-rouls and black curassows. The centre hosts "animal interctives" and Keeper for the Day opportunities with some of these animals for an additional fee.

As a member of BIAZA and through cooperation with European zoos, the centre has participated in breeding programs for several endangered species, including snow leopards, fossa, Rodrigues fruit bats and primates. Additionally, the centre has also contributed to overseas conservation projects, such as the Mountain Marmoset Conservation Programme, Money for Madagascar and the Snow Leopard Trust.

The main entrance features a gift shop and allows access to a café, named the Wild Café, which can be accessed with or without a zoo ticket.
