= Northumberland Zoo =

- Interactive map of Northumberland Zoo
- 55.2723°N 1.6996°W
- Date opened: 2011
- Location: Felton, Northumberland, England
- No. of species: 80
- Memberships: British and Irish Association of Zoos and Aquariums
- Website: https://www.northumberlandzoo.co.uk/

The Northumberland Zoo is a zoo in Felton, Northumberland, England.

== History ==
The zoo began with a tearoom that added poultry and livestock to its grounds in 2009.

The zoo opened in 2011 as Eshottheugh Animal Park, adding exotic species like meerkats. it changed its name to Northumberland County Zoo in 2015, before shortening it to its current name in 2018. It became a member of the British and Irish Association of Zoos and Aquariums in 2021.

== Animals and exhibits ==
- Native British Species – Eurasian harvest mouse and White-clawed crayfish
- Scottish wildcat
- Serval
- Asian small-clawed otter
- Snow leopard
- Raccoon
- Arctic fox
- Prairie dog
- Canada lynx
- American kestrel
- Tawny owl
- Barn owl
- Common buzzard
- Snowy owl
- Harris's hawk
- Bengal eagle owl
- Ural owl
- Great grey owl
- Common raven
- Asian brown owl
- Greater rhea
- Capybara House – Capybara and South American tapir
- Guinea pig
- European fallow deer
- Meerkat and Cape porcupine
- North American Porcupine and Siberian Chipmunk
- Grey parrot
- Fruit Bat Island – Livingstone's fruit bat
- Rainforest Lookout – Pygmy marmoset
- Red Squirrel

== Conservation ==
The zoo participates in various conservation efforts as a member of the British and Irish Association of Zoos and Aquariums.

- Eurasian harvest mice and White-clawed crayfish, breeding them in the Native Britain house, and working with conservation groups.
- Breeding Livingstone's fruit bats, as one of only three zoos to hold them. In 2023 a baby fruit bat was born.
- Snow leopards
