= Crocodiles of the World =

Zoo in Oxfordshire, England

- Crocodiles of the World logo
- Interactive map of Crocodiles of the World
- 51°46′38″N 1°35′05″W
- Date opened: 2011
- Location: Brize Norton, Oxfordshire, England
- No. of species: Over 30
- Website: https://www.crocodilesoftheworld.co.uk/

Crocodiles of the World is a zoo in Brize Norton, Oxfordshire in the United Kingdom specialising in crocodilia.

== History ==
Crocodiles of the World was started by Shaun Foggett in 2011 at a site in Crawley Mill, Witney, before moving to Brize Norton, both in Oxfordshire, UK. The creation of the original zoo was documented by a film crew for the television show Croc Man, which was broadcast on Channel 5.

Foggett had to sell his family home to fund the starting of the zoo.

== Animals ==
There are 19 of the 24 crocodile species in the world at the park, along with a range of other reptiles, turtles, and tortoises, including a group of Galápagos tortoise.

As well as the reptiles and amphibians, there are some meerkats, tamarins and birds.

The zoo has been involved in rescue rehoming, such as with taking in a crocodile which was kept in a greenhouse in Sweden.

A breeding programme has been successful, including being the first UK zoo (and second in Europe) to breed the false gharial (Tomistoma) crocodile with 10 of that species hatched in 2017.

== Visitor experience ==
The attraction is rated at 4.5 out of 5 on Tripadvisor.

As well as general admission, the zoo offers 'keeper experiences' with the crocodiles, meerkats, or monitor lizards.

== Professional membership and recognition ==
The zoo is a member of the British and Irish Association of Zoos and Aquariums (BIAZA), which is the main trade organisation for British animal parks.

It was the winner of the Best New Business award at the West Oxfordshire business awards in 2013, and won the Hospitality Award in 2015.

A photo of an American Alligator at the attraction was highly commended in the BIAZA 2020 photography competition.
