= Natureland Seal Sanctuary =

Seal sanctuary in Skegness, Lincolnshire, England

Coordinates: 53.1486°N 0.347°E

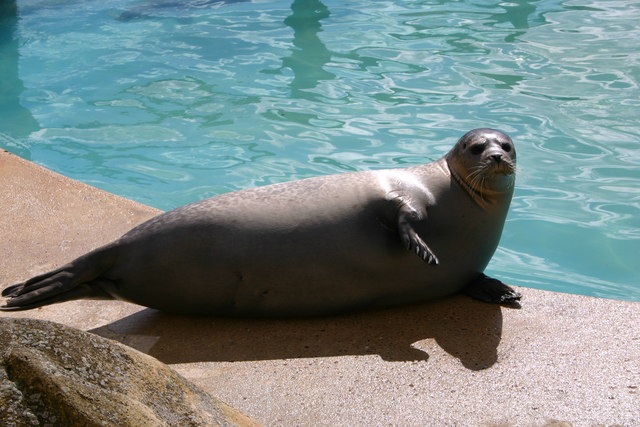
- Common seal at the Seal Sanctuary
- Abbreviation: Natureland
- Formation: 1965
- Legal status: Non-profit organisation
- Purpose: Seals in East Lindsey
- Location: North Parade, Skegness, Lincolnshire, PE25 1DB
- Region served: East Lindsey coast
- Members: Seals
- Website: NSS

Natureland Seal Sanctuary, also referred to as Skegness Natureland or Skegness Seal Sanctuary is an animal attraction in Skegness, Lincolnshire, England.

== Attractions ==
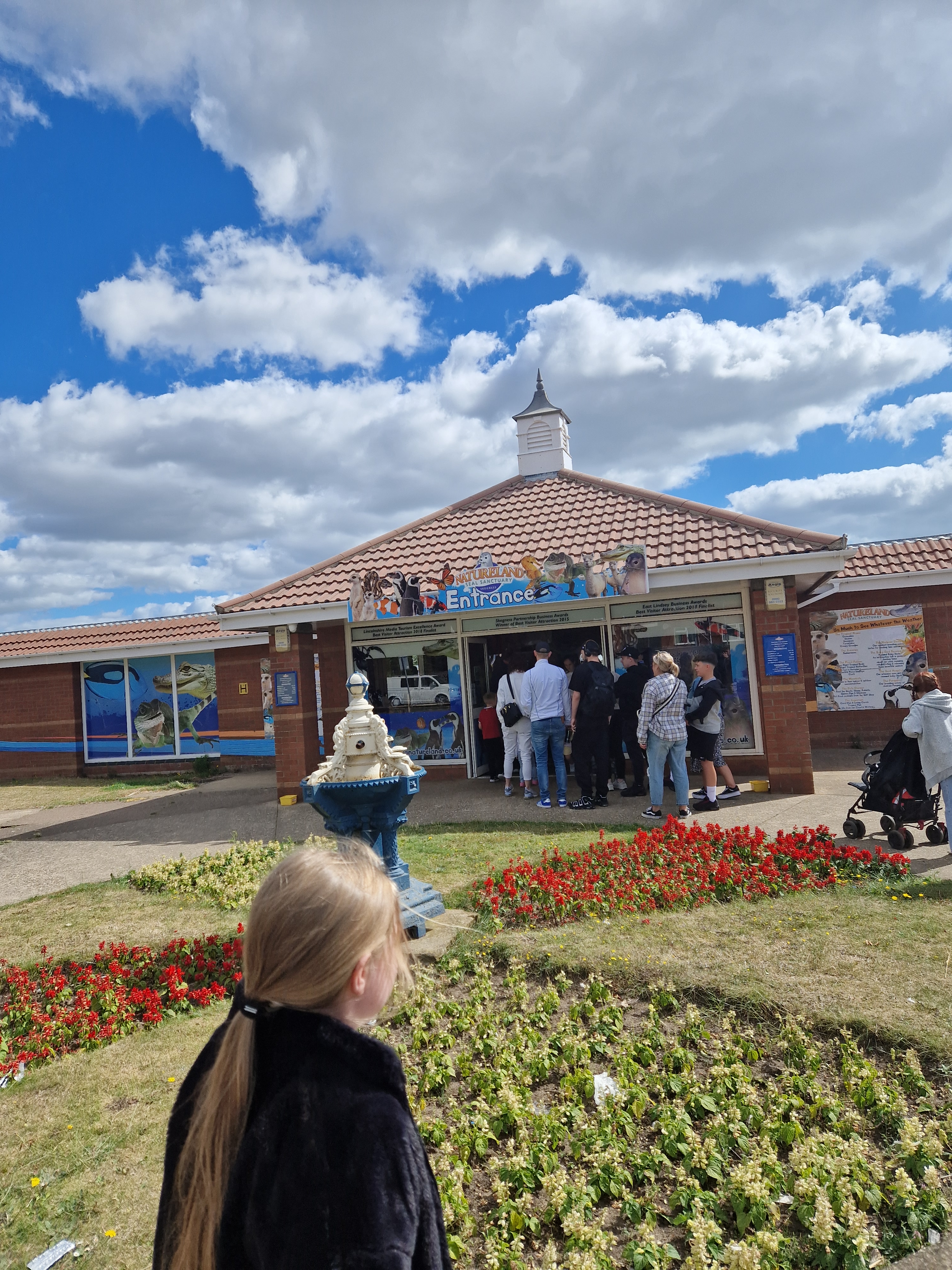
Entrance

Natureland is a seal sanctuary, with a seal hospital, a small zoo, tropical glasshouses (known as the 'Floral Palace') and an aquarium. Animals include seals, African penguins, crocodiles, goats, tarantulas, snakes, terrapins, scorpions, as well as tropical butterflies and birds. Glasshouses contain many exotic plants, including cacti from the US, Mediterranean shrubs and banana plants.

In the seal hospital, orphaned seal pups are reared before eventually being released back into the wild. 30-60 seals are rescued by Natureland each winter. In April 2018 Natureland rescued their 800th seal.

There are daily talks where the resident seals show off natural behaviours that have been enhanced by a training programme.

Facilities at the centre include a cafe/restaurant, gift shop, customer toilets and a small area for children to try their hand at activities including brass rubbing.

It is situated on North Parade, next to the beach, and open every day except Christmas Day, Boxing Day and New Years Day. There is a fee for entry.

== History ==
Before Natureland was opened there were butterfly houses, known even then as the 'Floral Palace', an aquarium and a gift shop at the site, which was run by an investment company based in Manchester.

Natureland was founded in 1965 by John Yeadon, when it was opened by Princess Margaret and the attraction is still run by Yeadon's family.

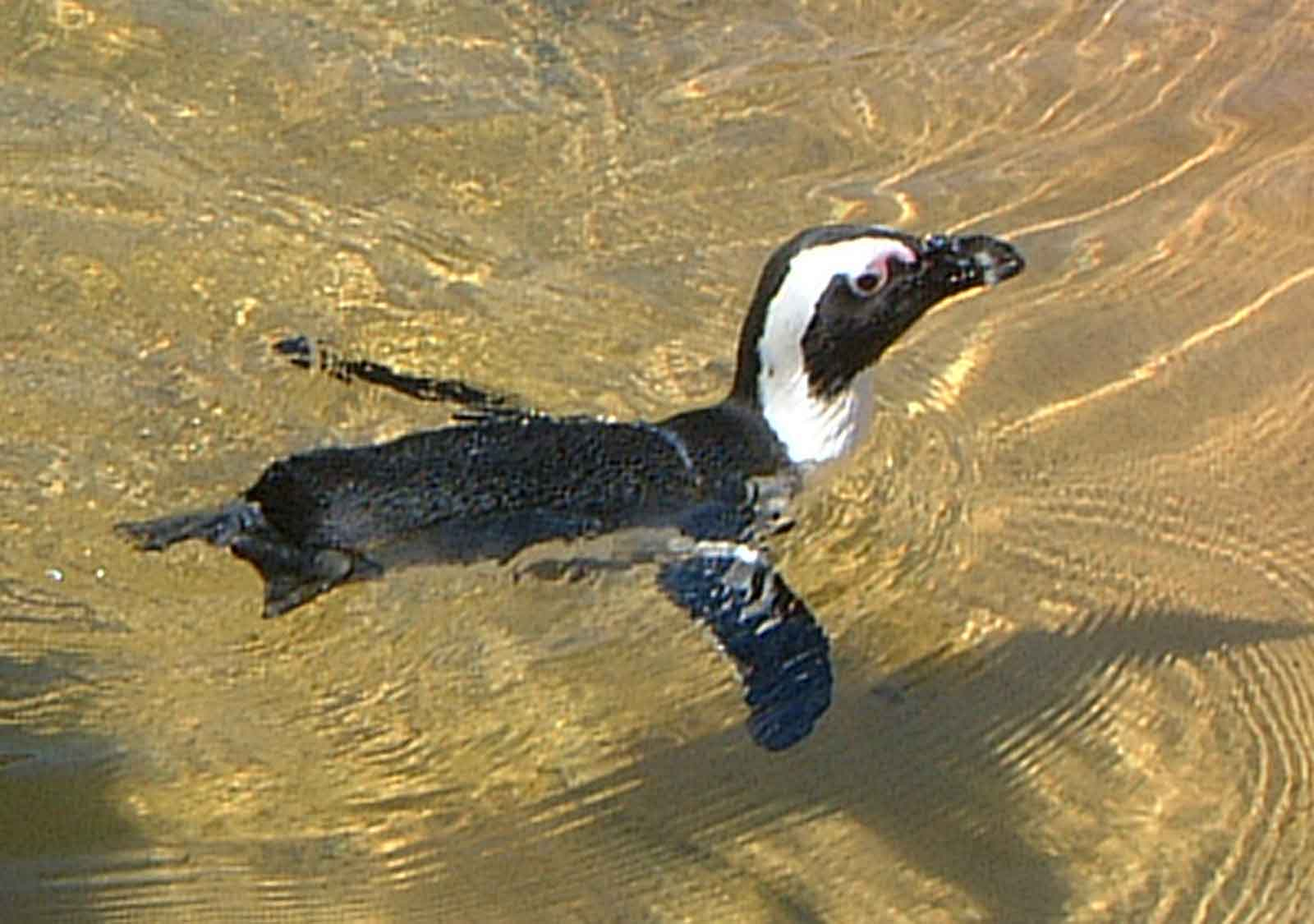
African penguin at Natureland in 2005

In 1966/67 Natureland featured in the BBC children's television programme Blue Peter and was visited by John Noakes.

In 1981 Natureland rescued a walrus, which they named 'Wally', which had strayed from the animals' usual Arctic range. It is rare for walruses to visit the United Kingdom and then they are usually only seen around the Scottish islands.

In 2012 Natureland rescued a rare hooded seal, which had travelled to Lincolnshire all the way from Greenland.

In 2015 a television series about the attraction ran on Estuary TV. and in 2017 BBC One ran a feature about Natureland on a programme called Countryfile Winter Diaries.

== See also ==
- Donna Nook
- Grey seal
- Mablethorpe Seal Sanctuary and Wildlife Centre
- Cornish Seal Sanctuary
- List of animal sanctuaries
