= Mablethorpe Seal Sanctuary and Wildlife Centre =

Seal sanctuary in Lincolnshire, England

Coordinates: 53.3573°N 0.2507°E

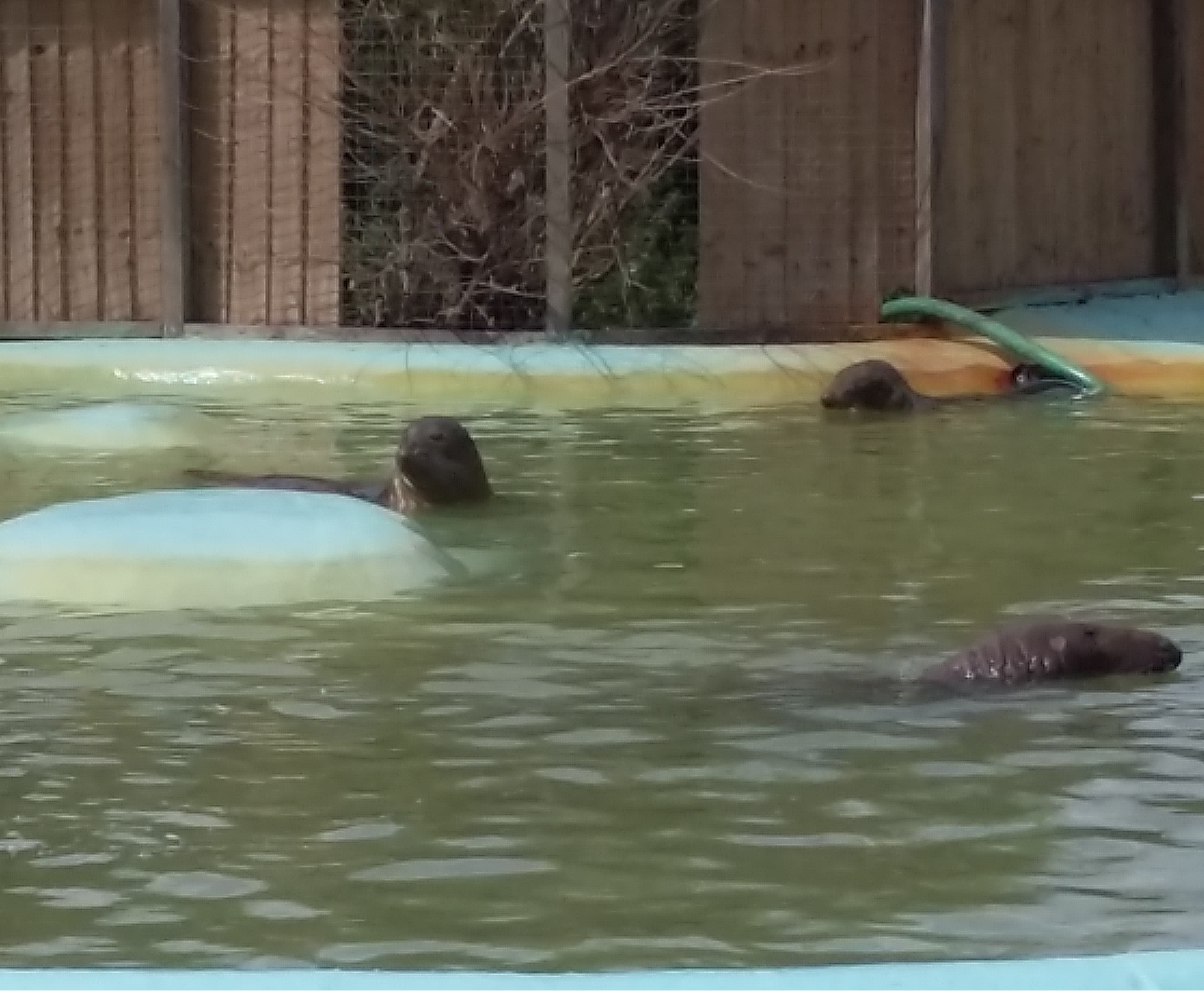
Common seals and grey seals recuperating together at Mablethorpe Seal Sanctuary and Wildlife Centre in 2017

The Mablethorpe Seal Sanctuary and Wildlife Centre, often abbreviated to Mablethorpe Seal Sanctuary or Mablethorpe Wildlife Centre is a seal sanctuary and animal attraction in the coastal town of Mablethorpe, Lincolnshire, England. It is a tourist attraction and works to rehabilitate sick and injured seals. It is located close to the seal breeding colony at Donna Nook and many of the animals it rescues are young seals born there.

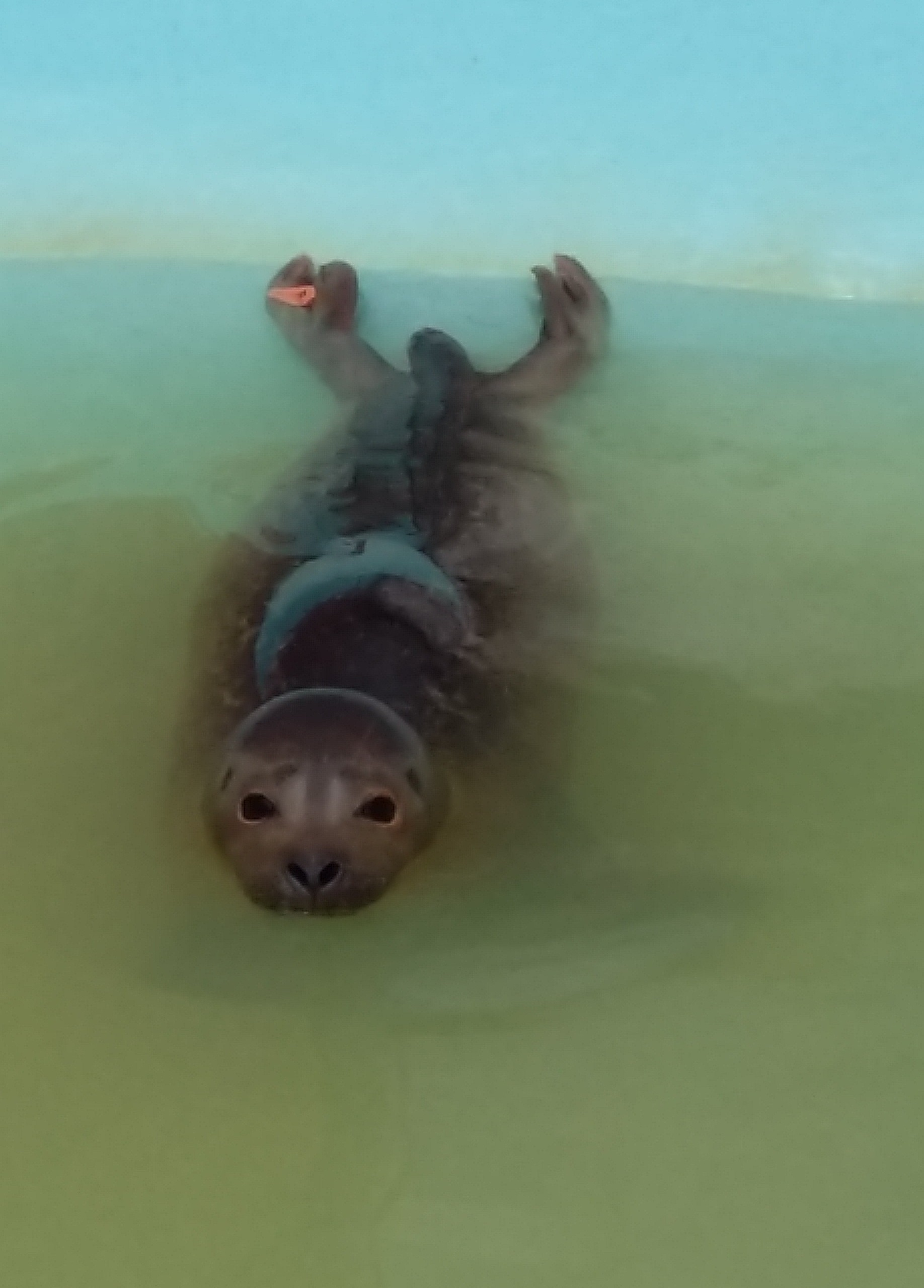
a young common seal at Mablethorpe Seal Sanctuary in 2017

Other animals visitors can see at the attraction include gibbons, meerkats and birds of prey. The attraction works with a charity called Mablethorpe Animal Rescue and accommodates much rescued native British wildlife, as well as exotic species.

In the 'Time Walking' zone, visitors can view fossils of dinosaurs and other extinct megafauna, including allosaurus, archaeopteryx and mosasaur. Another part of the attraction is themed around the ice ages, and animals which have become extinct in Britain since then, featuring Eurasian lynx. There is also a café and gift shop.

== Location and admissions ==
The Seal Sanctuary is located on Quebec Road, North End, close to the sand dunes, and is open 10:00 to 16:30, 10 months a year. There is a fee for entry.

== History ==
Before the Seal Sanctuary opened, the site served as a look-out point in the Second World War, as a firing range and a campsite.

The attraction opened in Mablethorpe after an animal attraction called the Animal and Bird Garden, founded in 1965 in Suffolk, was flooded and the owners (Jerry and Rene King) decided to relocate. The seal sanctuary received its first seal in 1974, opening to the public in the same year, still under the name Animal and Bird Garden.

In 1988 an appeal in the Daily Mail helped the Seal Sanctuary to raise £20,000 to deal with an outbreak of phocine distemper virus. The Seal Hospital opened in 1990.

In 2013 the attraction changed its official name from Mablethorpe Seal Sanctuary to the Mablethorpe Seal Sanctuary and Wildlife Centre.

There was a fire at the Seal Sanctuary in September 2016. The Education Room reopened in February 2017.

== See also ==
- Natureland Seal Sanctuary
- List of extinct animals of the British Isles
