= Hertfordshire Zoo =

Zoo in Hertfordshire, founded 1984

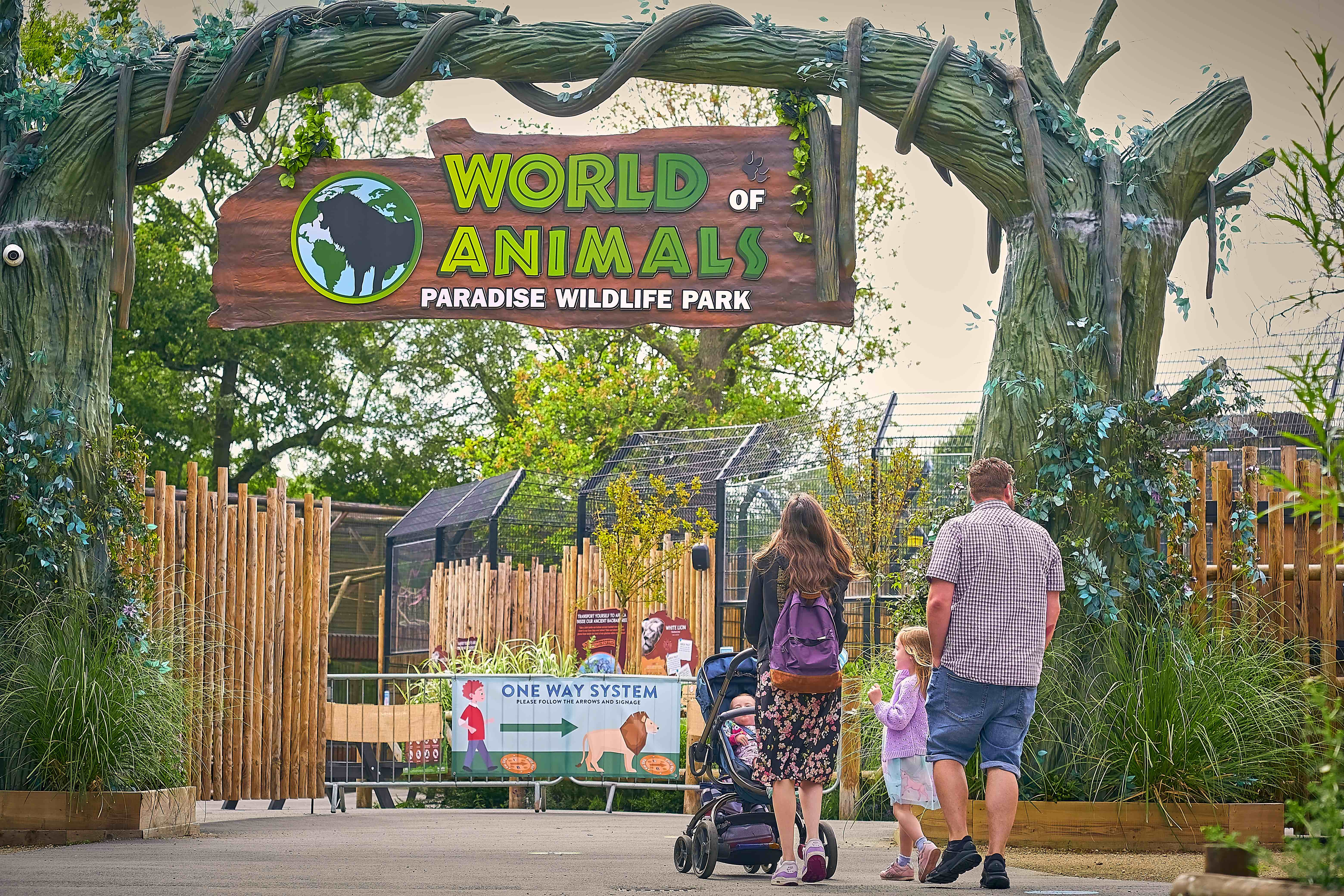
- Interactive map of Hertfordshire Zoo
- 51.74400°N 0.06210°W
- Date opened: 1960s
- Location: White Stubbs Lane; Broxbourne, Herts EN10 7QA
- Major exhibits: Land of the Tigers, Amazon & Beyond, Lion Pride lands, Sun Bear Heights, Jaguar Jungle, Penguin Falls, Farmyard, Rainforest Experience, Reptile Temple
- Website: hertfordshirezoo.com

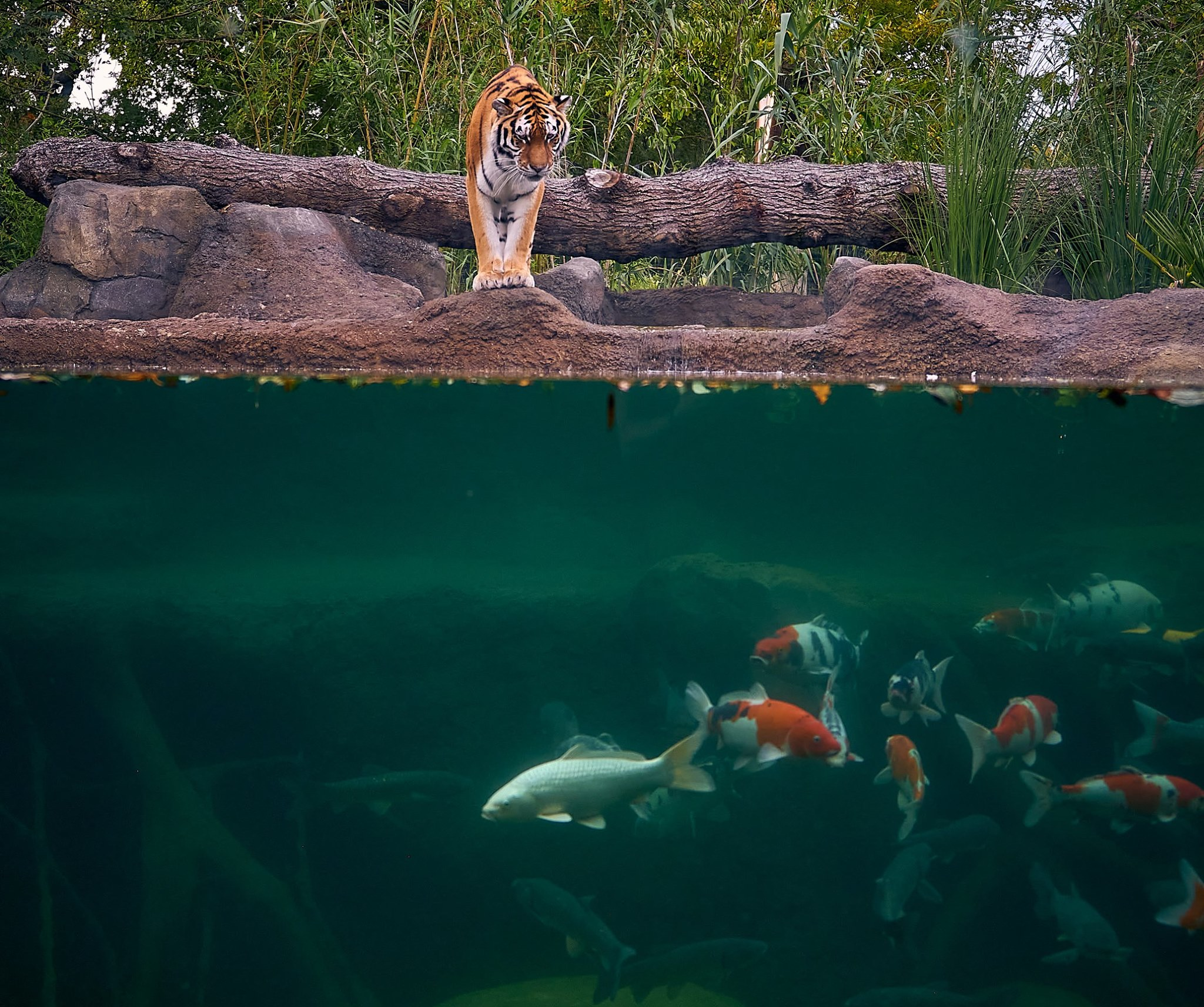

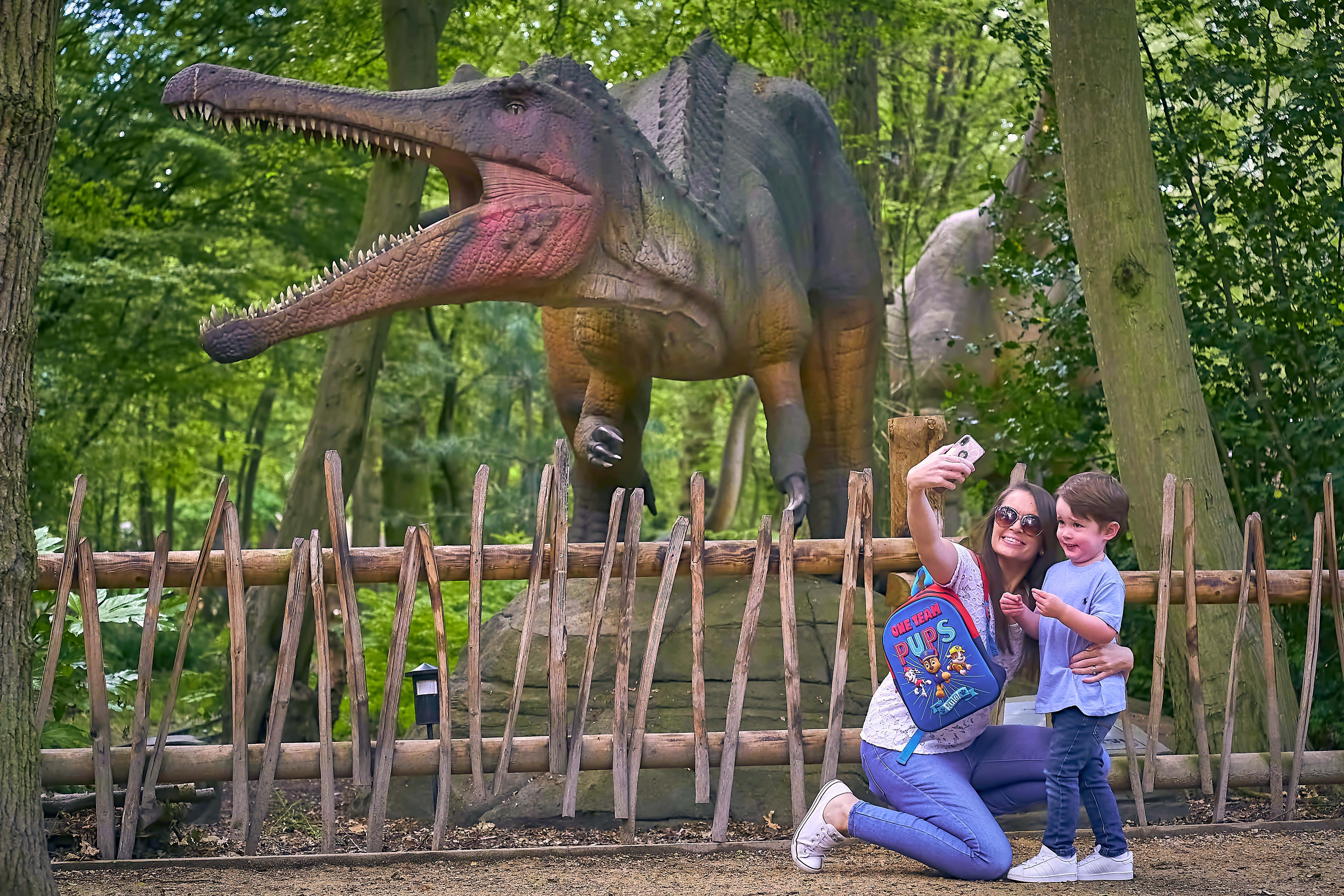

Hertfordshire Zoo, previously known as Paradise Wildlife Park and before that as Broxbourne Zoo, is a family-run wildlife park and charity in Broxbourne, in Hertfordshire, England. It came under the management of the Peter and Grace Sampson family in 1984; in 2017, their daughter Lynn Whitnall became chief executive and continued the family business. Also in 2017, the family founded the Zoological Society of Hertfordshire, a registered charity (no.1108609). The zoo receives no government funding.

Among the animals in the zoo are Amur tigers, white lions, snow leopards and Eurasian wolves, as well as African penguins, red pandas, green anacondas, two-toed sloths, ring-tailed lemurs, meerkats, Bactrian camels, plains zebras and Brazilian tapirs.

On 4 April 2022, the park announced that it would be rebranding to Hertfordshire Zoo as part of its 40th anniversary celebrations in 2024.

== History ==
The zoo opened in the early 1960s as Broxbourne Zoo. By 1984, it had earned a reputation as one of the UK's worst zoos.

In 1984, the Sampson family purchased the site with the intention of re-housing the animals into larger enclosures that mimicked their natural habitat, making them as comfortable as possible. The zoo was closed down for two years to undergo this transformation and re-opened as "Paradise Park and Woodland Zoo", which was then shortened to Paradise Wildlife Park in the 1990s.

Paradise Wildlife Park, like many animal attractions in England, was forced to close by the Foot and Mouth epidemic in the spring of 2001.

In 2000, Parkside Leisure, the parent company of Paradise Wildlife Park, purchased the site of the Big Cat Foundation in Kent, a sanctuary operated at the time by the Born Free Foundation. A new organisation was established by Paradise Wildlife Park called the Wildlife Heritage Foundation (WHF).

Since becoming the Zoological Society of Hertfordshire in 2017 (registered charity no.1108609), the zoo has made significant investment in upgrading and expanding its facilities.

Since 2020, CBBC show 'One Zoo Three' has been filmed at the zoo, featuring brothers Aaron, Tyler and Cam Whitnall.

== Animals ==
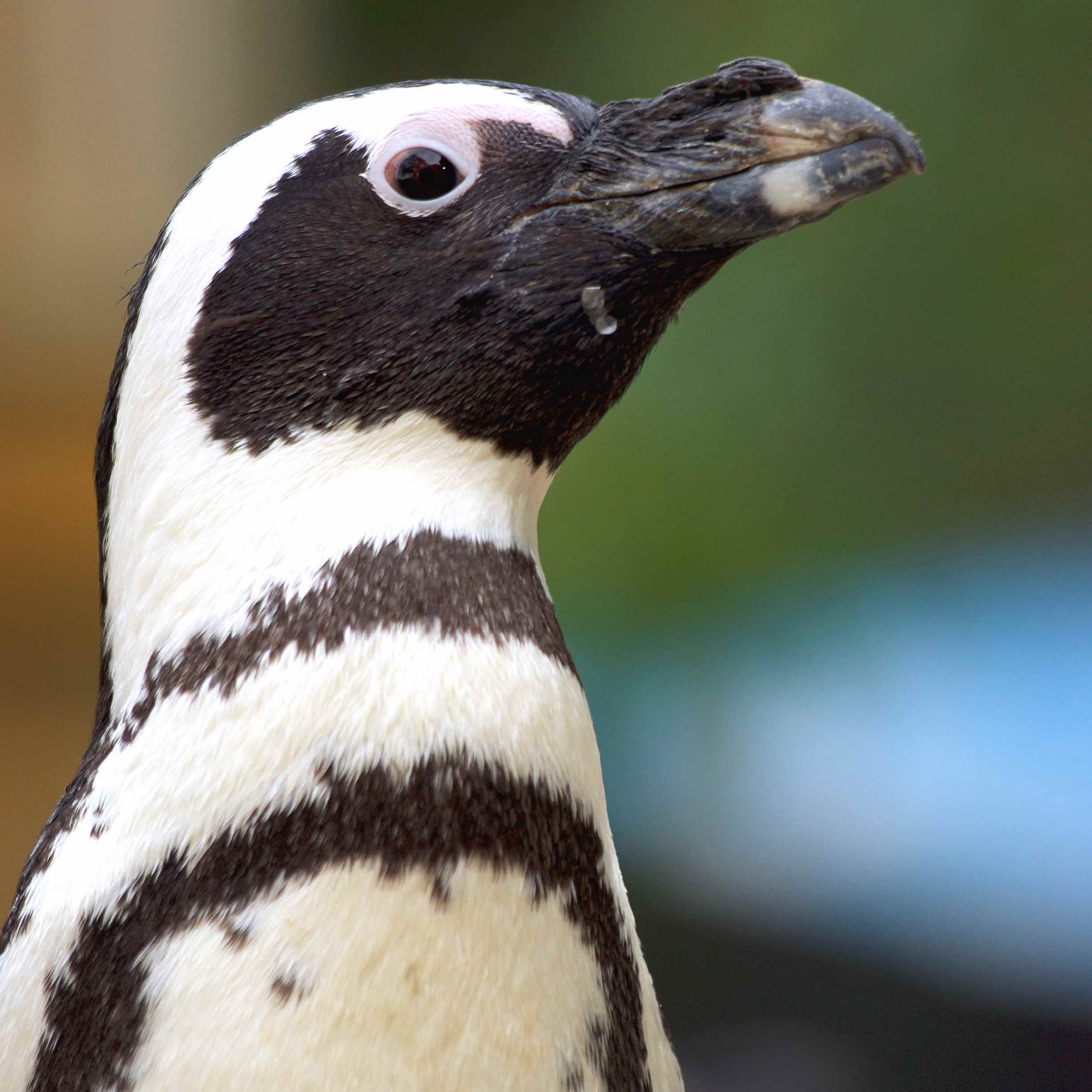
African penguin

The zoo is home to several hundred animals, including small mammals, paddock and farmyard animals, birds, primates, reptiles, and big cats. It includes Siberian tigers, snow leopards, ocelot, jaguars and white lions.

The Angkor Reptile Temple houses the largest anaconda in the UK, named Optimus Prime.
