= British and Irish Association of Zoos and Aquariums =

UK and Ireland charitable organisation

- Predecessor: The Federation of Zoological Gardens of Great Britain and Ireland
- Founded: 1966
- Headquarters: United Kingdom
- Revenue: 236,125 pound sterling (2020)
- Number of employees: 9 (2024)
- Website: biaza.org.uk

The British and Irish Association of Zoos and Aquariums (BIAZA) (formerly the Federation of Zoological Gardens of Great Britain and Ireland) is a registered charity and the professional body representing over 100 zoos and aquariums in Britain and Ireland.

BIAZA members must comply with BIAZA codes of practice, as well as undertaking significant work in the field of animal welfare, conservation, education and research.

== Key objectives ==
=== Conservation ===
BIAZA members support over 700 field conservation projects contributing over £11 million per year. Members supply skills, staff and equipment for wildlife conservation, and essential materials for education and awareness programmes in developing countries. They also play an important role in conservation awareness-raising in the UK, support conservation campaigns and facilitate career development of young conservationists.

=== Education ===
More than 25 million people visit BIAZA collections every year including 1.3 million children on organised education trips. BIAZA encourages its members to develop an effective education system aiming to conserve the natural world in a number of ways by motivating people to change their habits, inspiring people to get involved with conservation and encouraging people to donate to particular conservation programmes.

=== Research ===
Research in BIAZA zoos and aquariums aims to gather knowledge that benefits the conservation of threatened species. BIAZA collections assist over 800 research projects to raise awareness and increase knowledge about wildlife and global issues.

A significant number of zoo animals housed within the UK are part of European breeding programmes (EEPs) which aim to preserve threatened species for the future by pairing compatible individuals.

== Awards ==
An annual event is held at which awards are given out for a variety of achievements, known as the "Zoo Oscars". Awards categories include: Animal Breeding, Care and Welfare; Conservation; Education; Exhibits; Horticulture; PR, Marketing, Digital and Events; Research; Sustainability. There are also awards for individuals and collections that make outstanding contributions.

== See also ==
- World Association of Zoos and Aquariums
- European Association of Zoos and Aquaria
- List of Zoological Gardens and Aquariums in United Kingdom
- List of Zoos and Aquariums in Ireland
- List of zoo associations
