= Artis (zoo) =

Zoo in Amsterdam, the Netherlands

Artis Royal Zoo
- Natura Artis Magistra
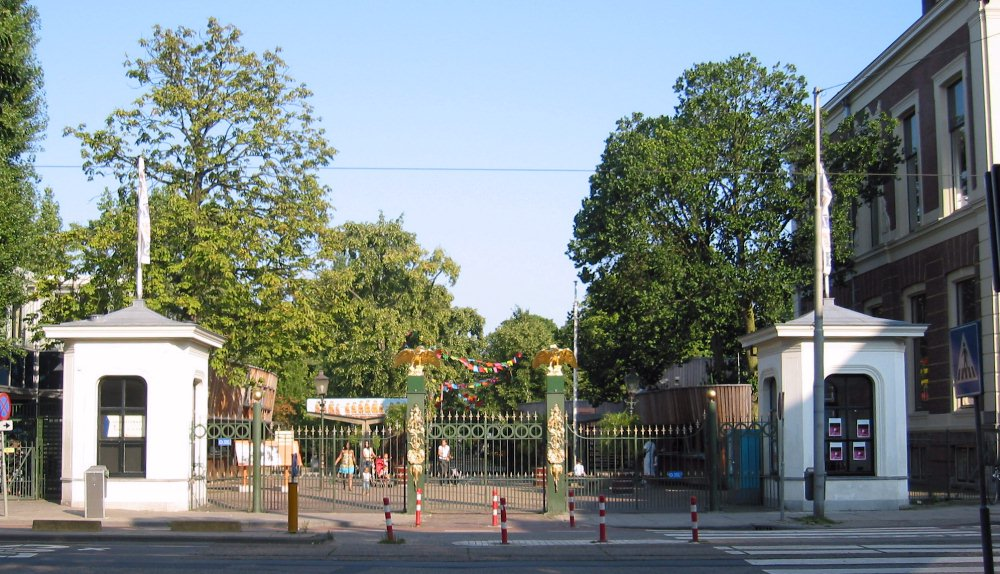
- The zoo's entrance in 2004
- Interactive map of Artis Royal Zoo
- 52°21′58″N 04°55′00″E
- Date opened: 1838; 188 years ago
- Location: Amsterdam, Netherlands
- No. of species: 900
- Annual visitors: 1,269,538 (2024)
- Memberships: NVD, EAZA, ISIS, WAZA
- Director: Rembrandt Sutorius
- Public transit: Artis (tram stop line 14)
- Website: www.artis.nl/en

Natura Artis Magistra (Latin for "Nature is the teacher of art"), commonly known just as Artis (Dutch pronunciation: [ˈɑrtɪs]), is a zoo and botanical garden in the centre of Amsterdam. It is the oldest zoo in the Netherlands and fifth oldest zoo in the world that is still operating.

In addition to the zoo, Artis also contains an aquarium, a planetarium, an arboretum, Micropia, and the Groote Museum ("big museum" in Dutch). A part of the art collection is on display in the aquarium building of the zoo. Artis contains 27 historically significant (listed) buildings, bridges, and ponds, most of which are still used as animal enclosures.

The zoo is a member of the Dutch Zoo Federation (NVD), the European Association of Zoos and Aquaria (EAZA), Species360, the World Association of Zoos and Aquariums (WAZA) and the Nederlandse Vereniging van Botanische Tuinen (NVBT).

== History ==
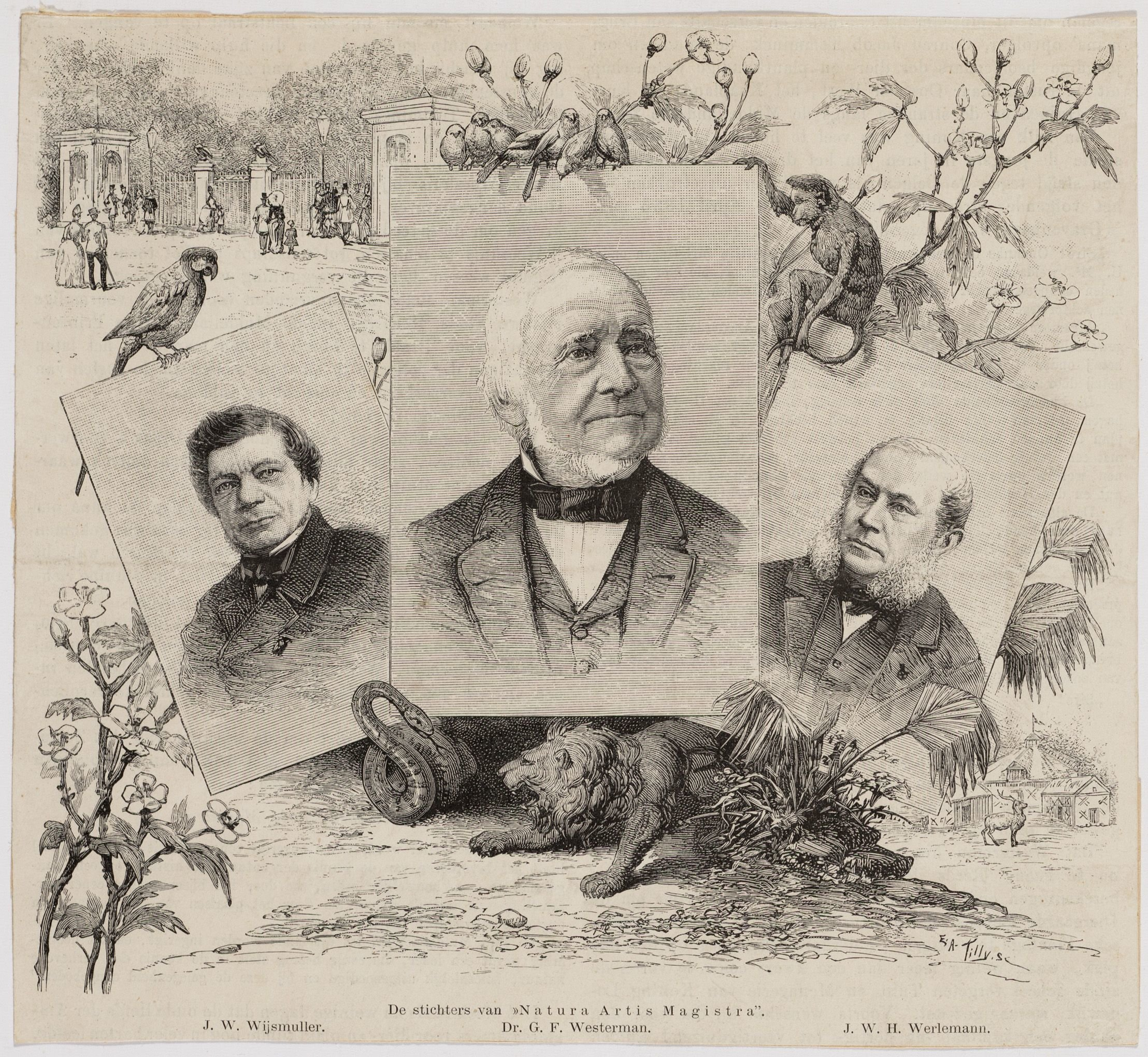
Litho of the zoo's founders J.J. Wijsmuller, G.F. Westerman, and J.W.H. Werlemann from 1888

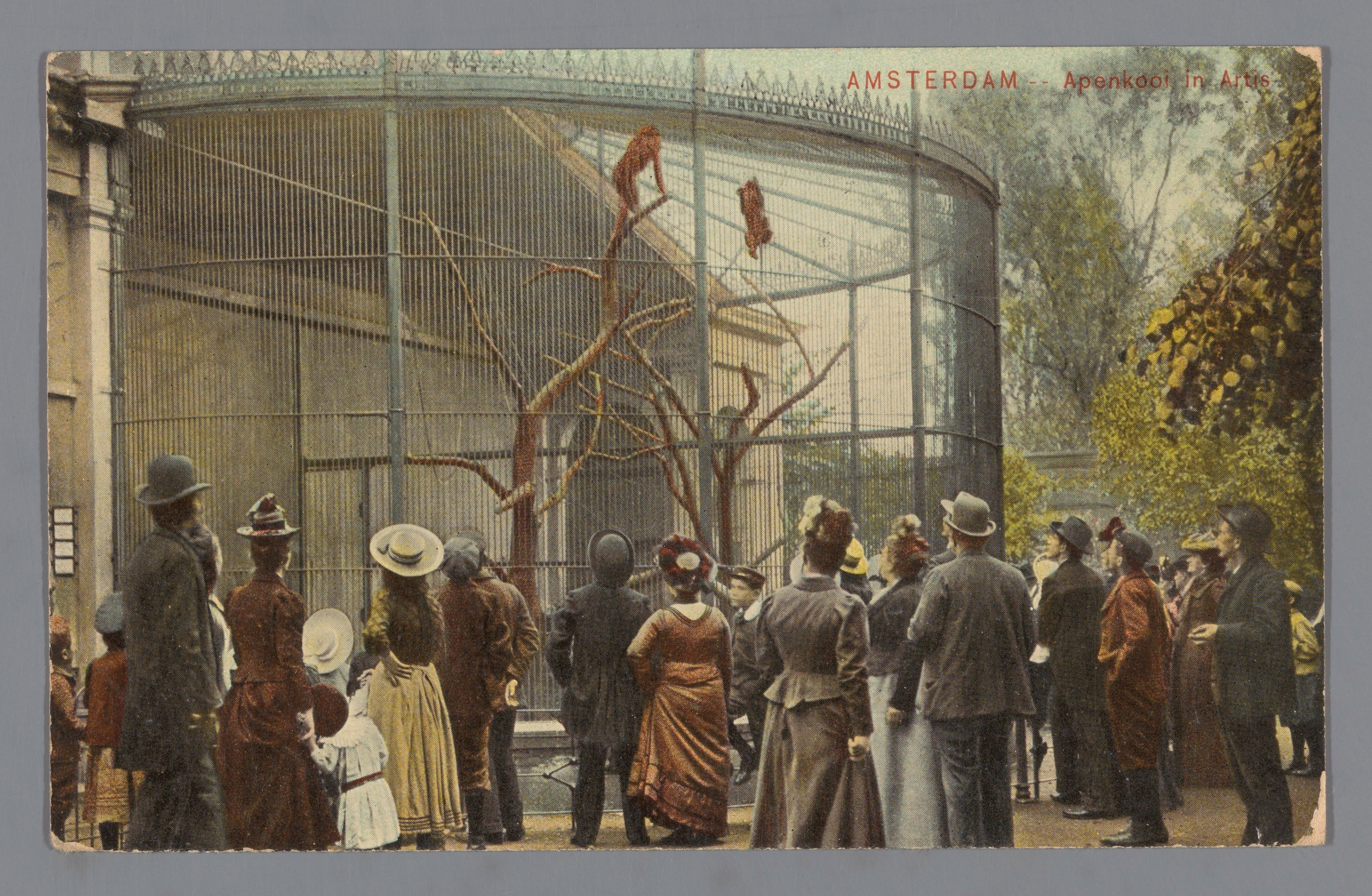
Postcard of the monkey cage in 1908

The zoo was founded in 1838 by three zoology enthusiasts, Gerard Westerman, J.W.H. Werlemann and J.J. Wijsmuller (also known as the three Ws). It was initially open only to members. Starting in 1851 it was opened to the public during the month of September. In 1920 it was opened year-round to the public, but September remains discount month.

The core of the current zoo property, then the "Middenhof" estate, was purchased by the board of the zoological society "Natura Artis Magistra" late in 1838 in the Plantage, which was then a thinly populated area on the outskirts of Amsterdam. From the start it exhibited both live and mounted specimens.

The zoo is commonly referred to as Artis, because the zoo has three gates with the words 'Natura', 'Artis', and 'Magistra' written above each of them, respectively, which combined formed its actual name. More often than not, only the middle gate was open, so that people who walked through it, seeing that 'Artis' was written above it, believed that the zoo was just called Artis. Thanks to this, soon few people knew it by its full name: Natura Artis Magistra.

The last quagga in captivity died at Artis on 12 August 1883, because all zebras were referred to as quagga, nobody realized this was the last quagga alive until years later.

The extensive ethnographic collection that Artis displayed for a long time in its Ethnographic Museum was transferred in 1921 to the nearby Tropenmuseum.

In recent years, Artis has taken steps to improve the living conditions of animals, while attention to its colonial past in educational communications has remained limited.

== Historic buildings ==
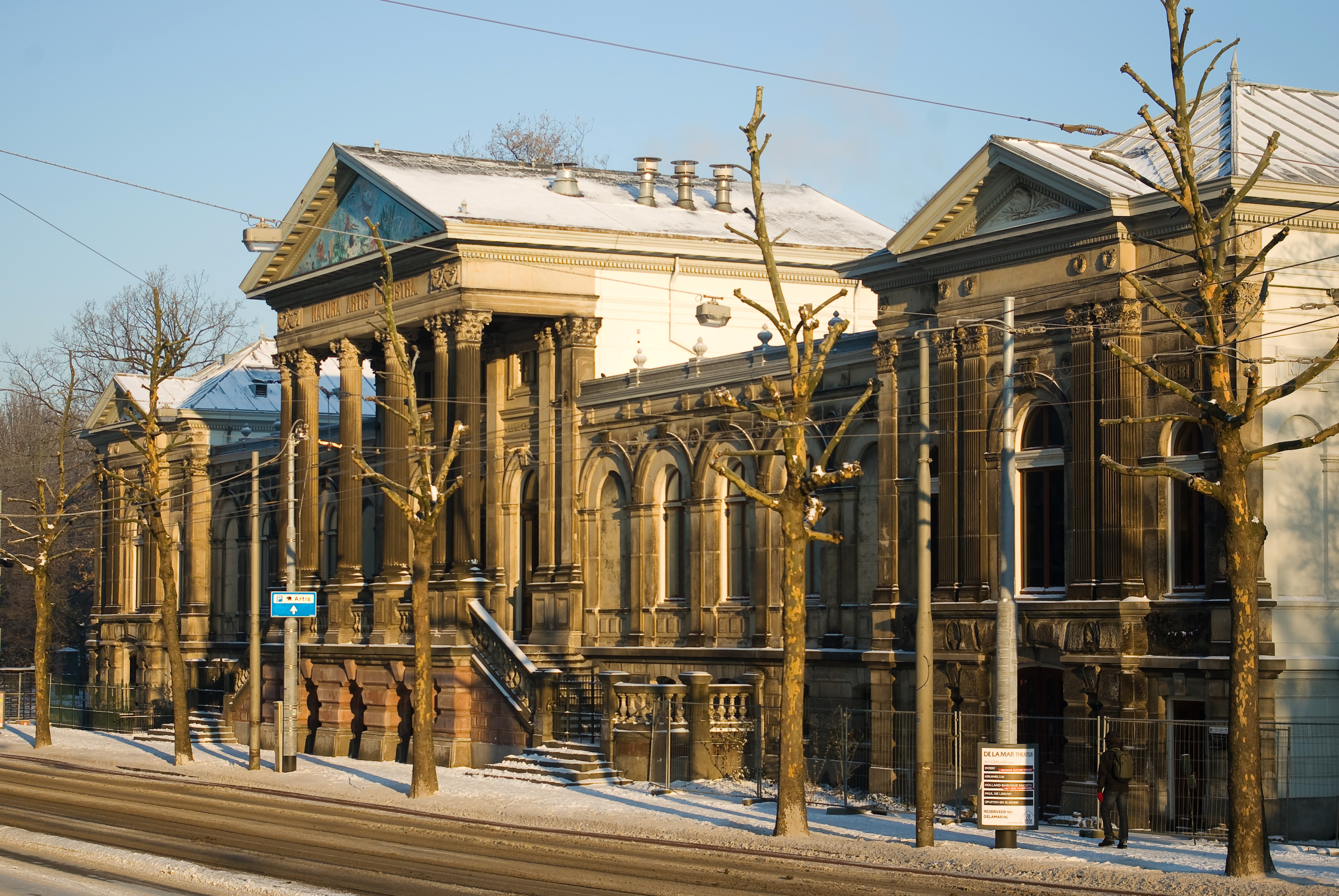
Aquarium building in 2012

Artis includes 27 historic buildings. The aquarium was built in 1882 on land leased from the city on condition that only a museum ever be built on it. The Heimans-diorama (1926) is located in the back of the aquarium. The library dates back to 1867 and the building the 'Ledenlokalen' on the right side of the main entrance dates back to the 19th century as well.

The wolf house (formerly an inn), and the Masman Garden House which now houses scarlet ibis were both on the site before the zoo was established.

== Library ==
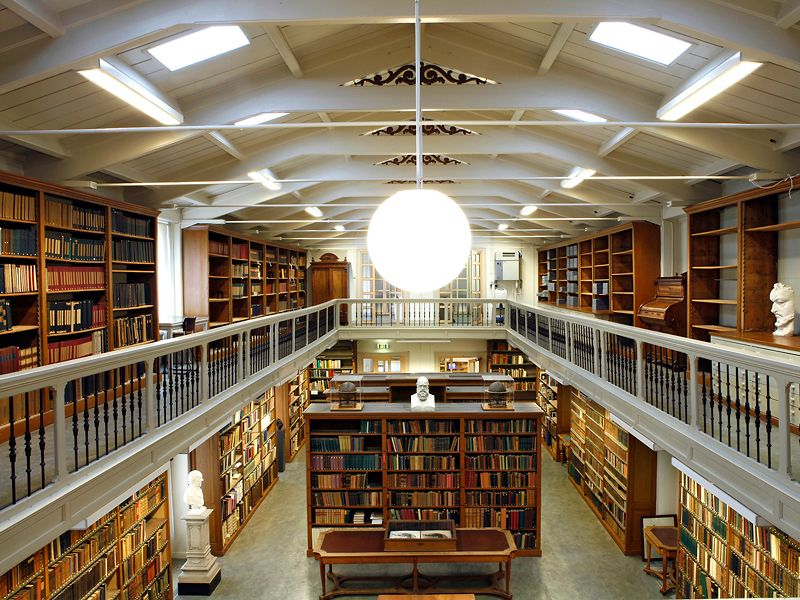
Reading room of the library in 2012

Artis has a library on the history of zoology and botany. It houses the library of the zoo, as well as the libraries of the Zoological Museum Amsterdam and the Amsterdam Botanical Garden. It also hosts the archives of a number of zoologists and botanists, such as the archive of Hugo de Vries. It contains 20,000 books, 3000 manuscripts and 80,000 animal prints.

The library is part of the special collections of the University of Amsterdam.

== Gallery ==
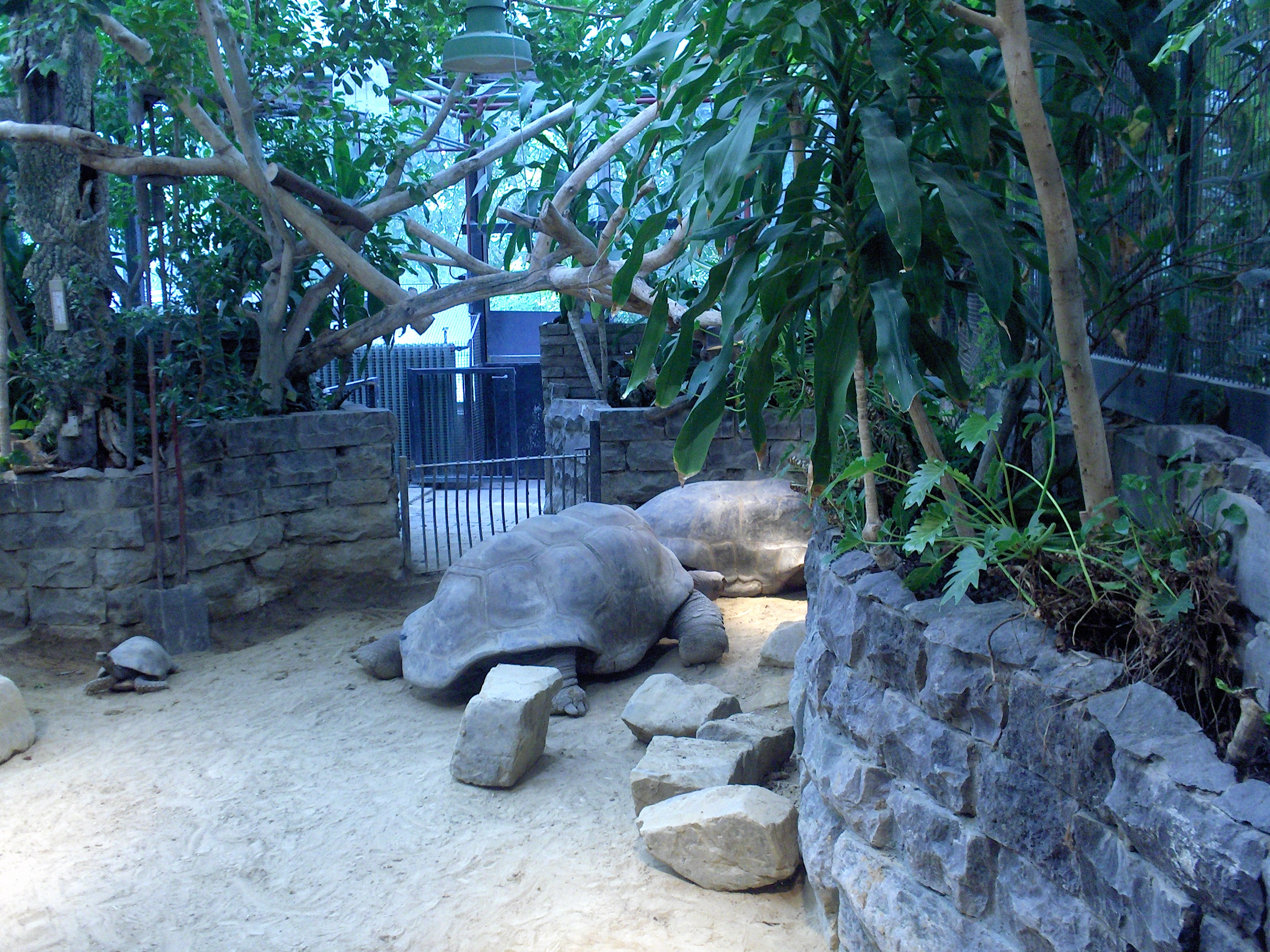
Aldabra tortoises at Artis

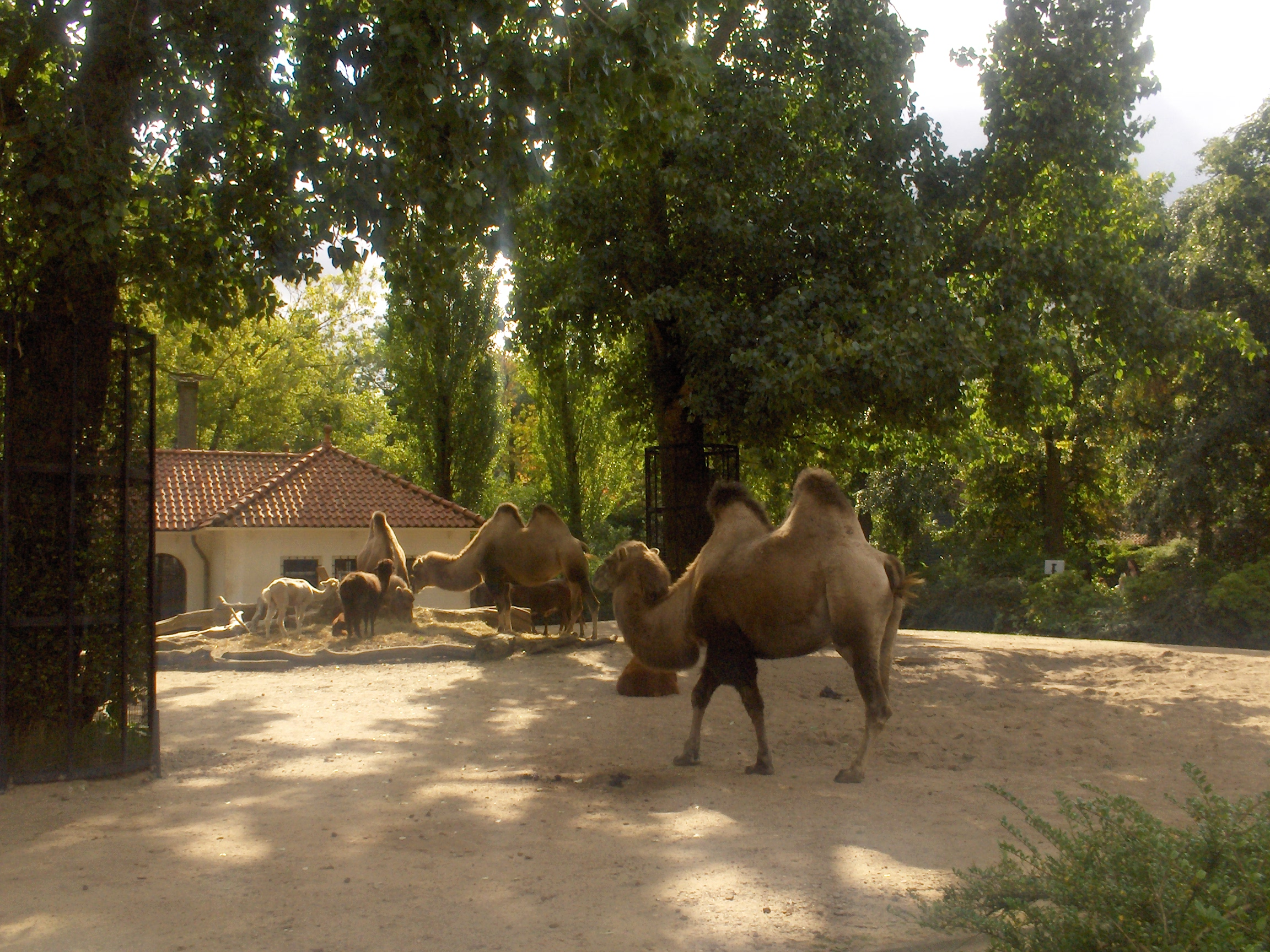
Camels at Artis

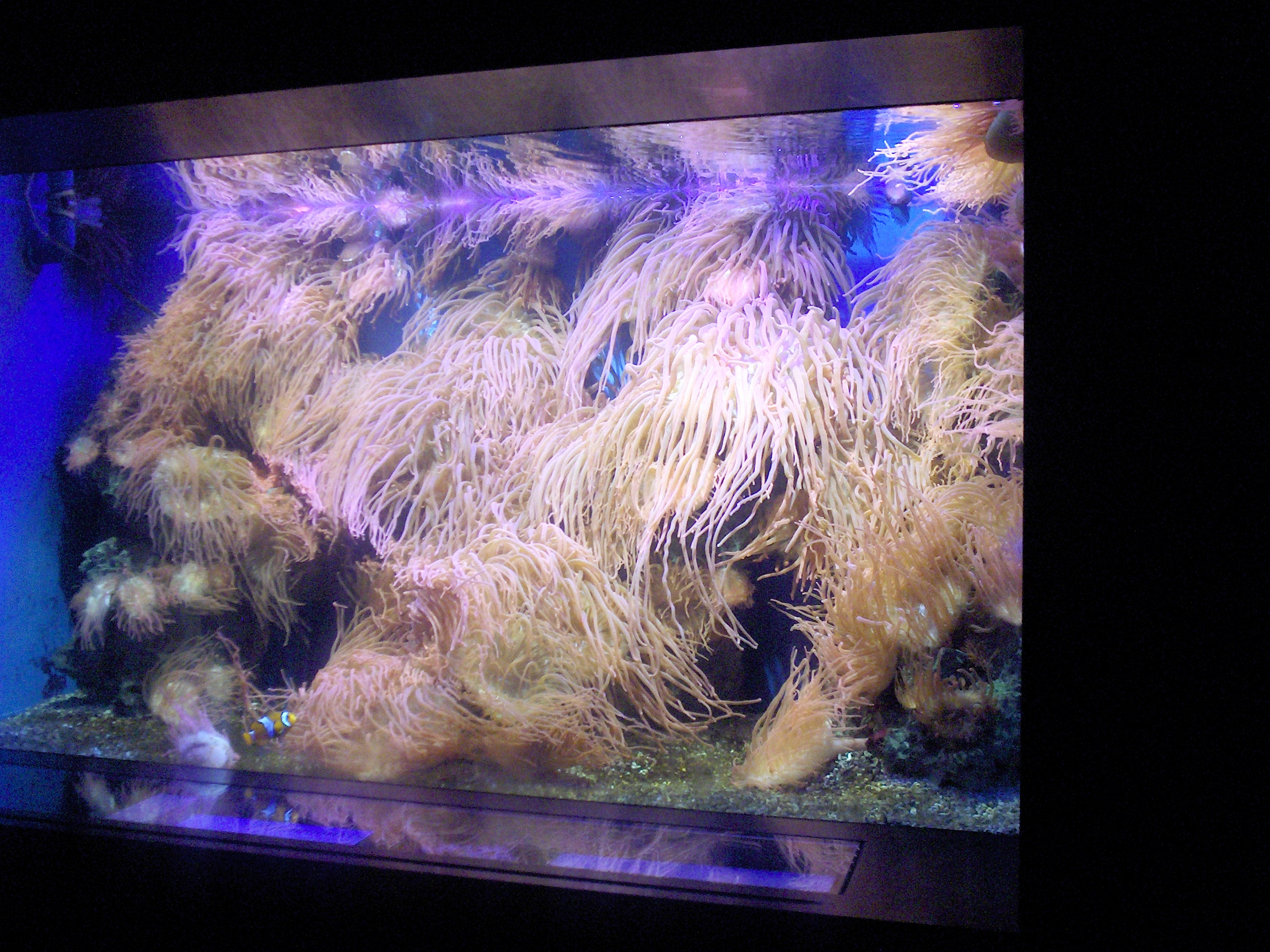
Artis aquarium

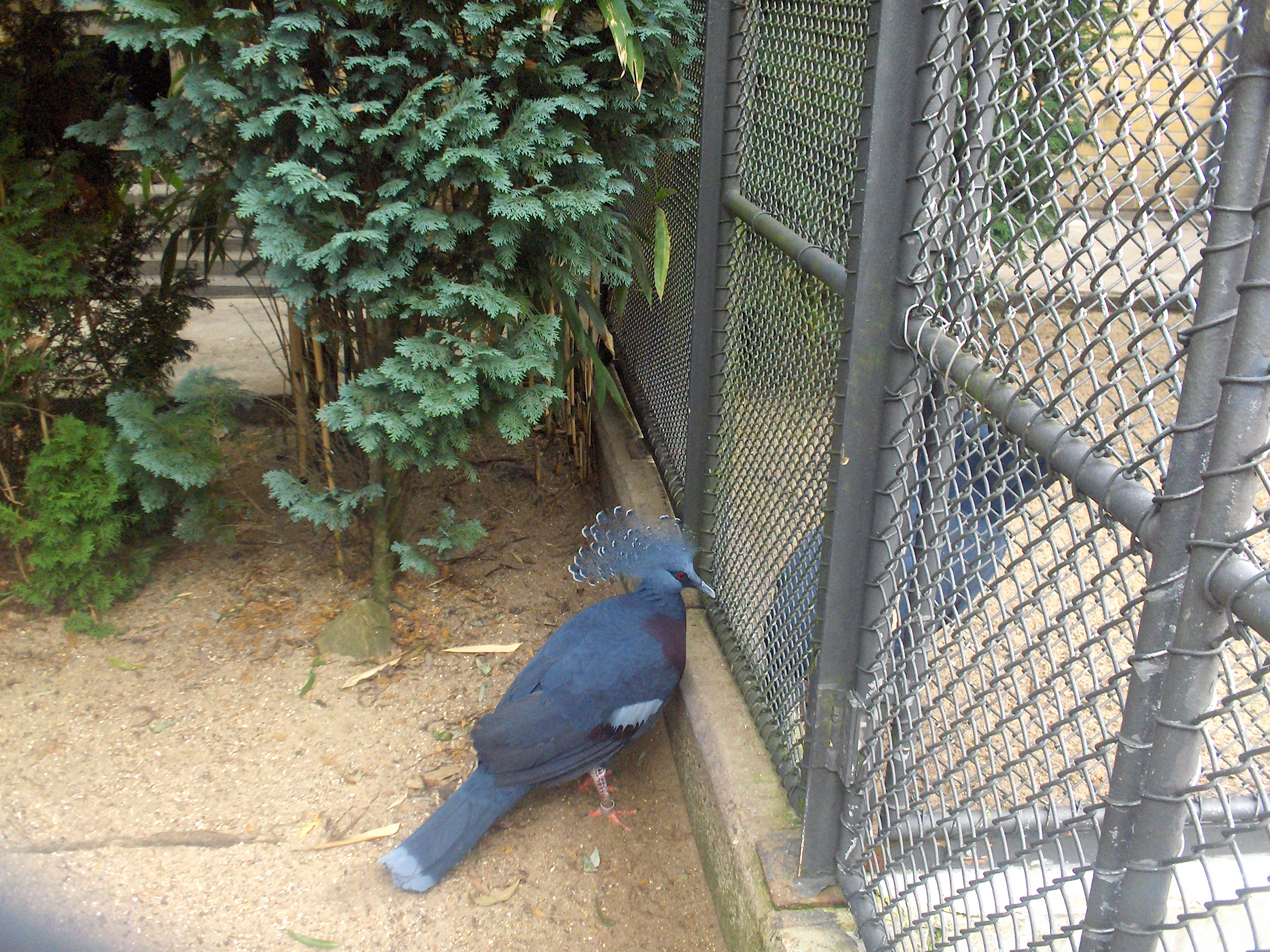
Crowned pigeons at Artis

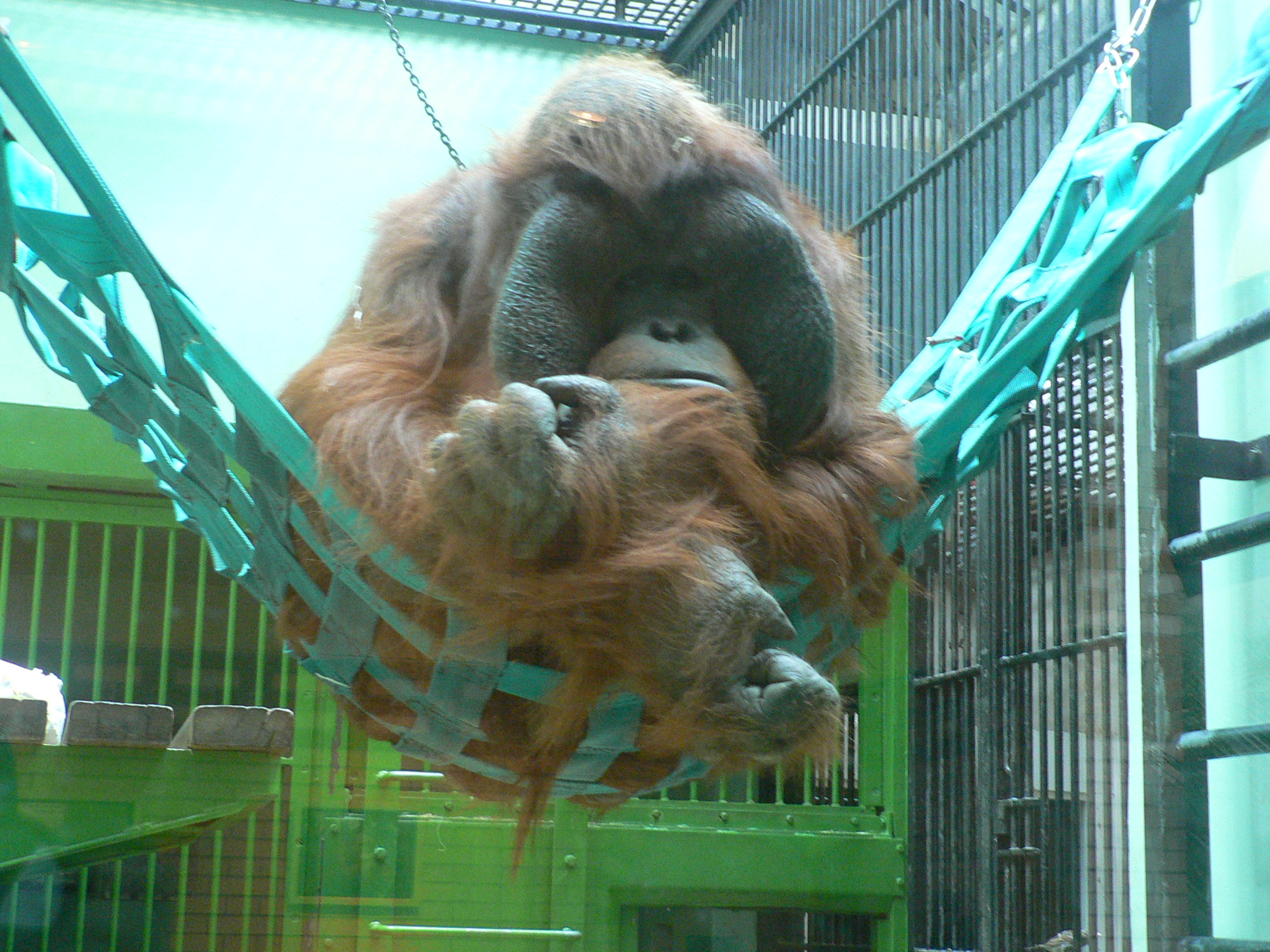
There are no longer any orangutans at Artis

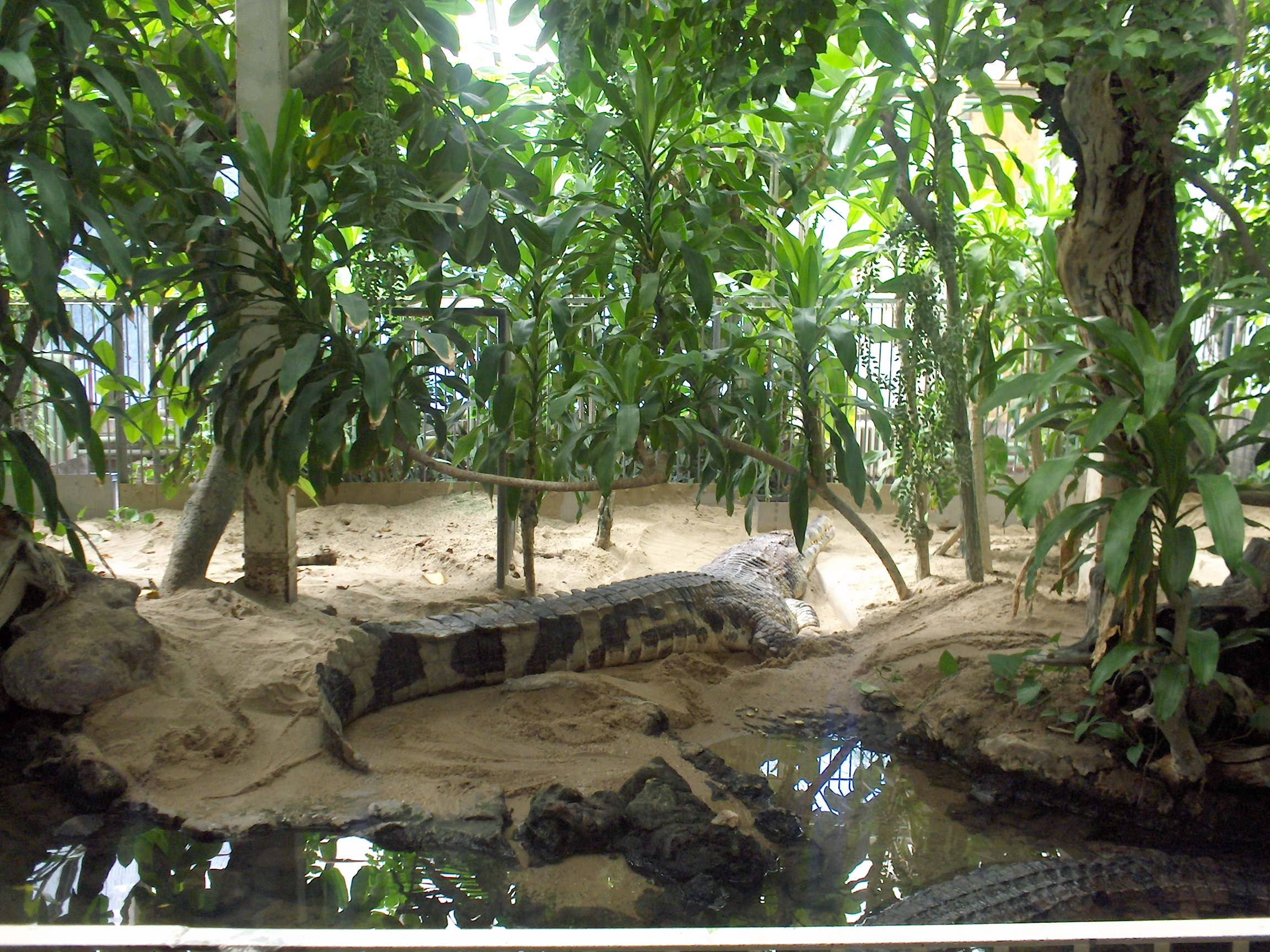
Crocodiles at Artis

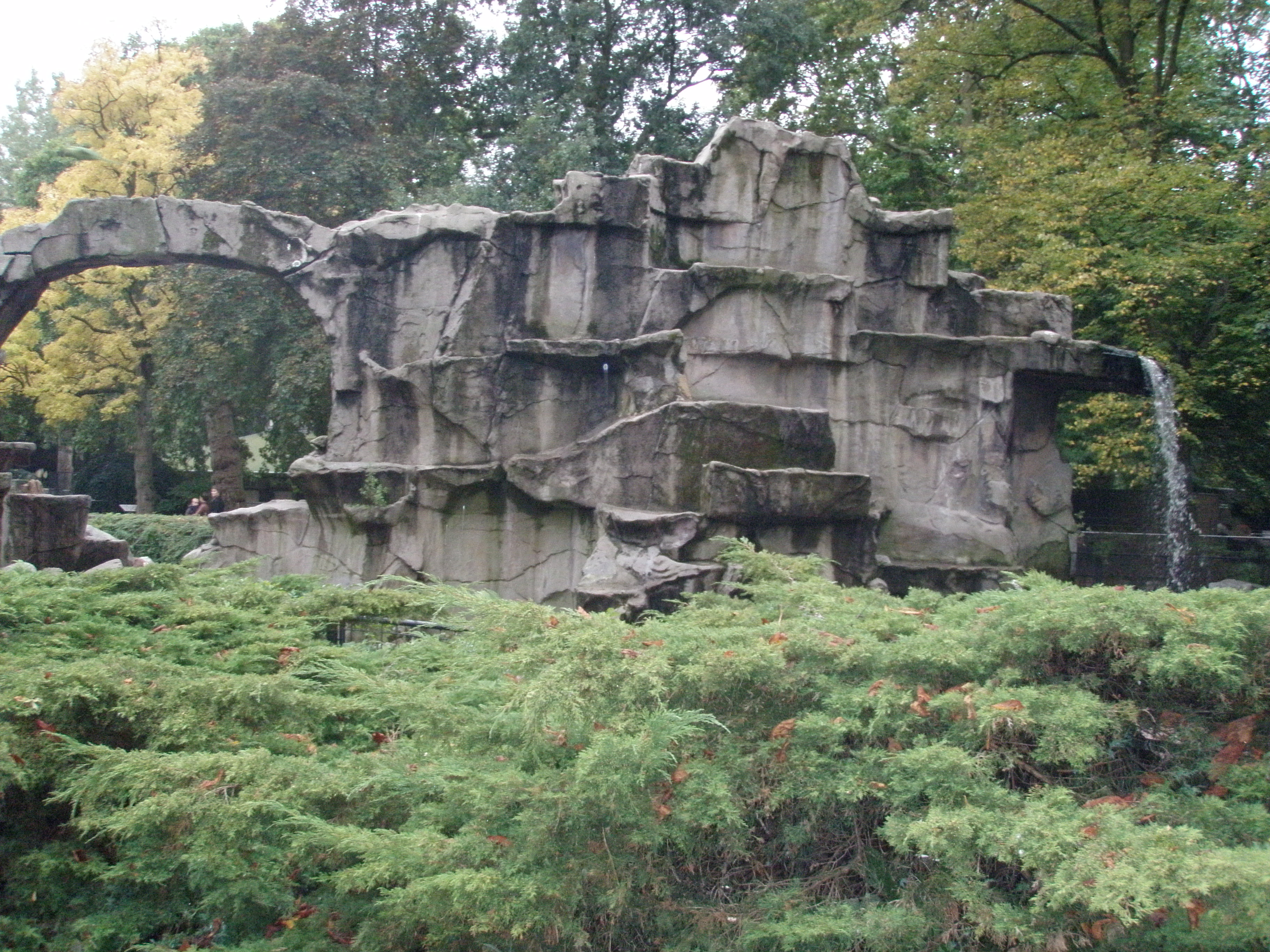
Dreams - A rock facade in Artis

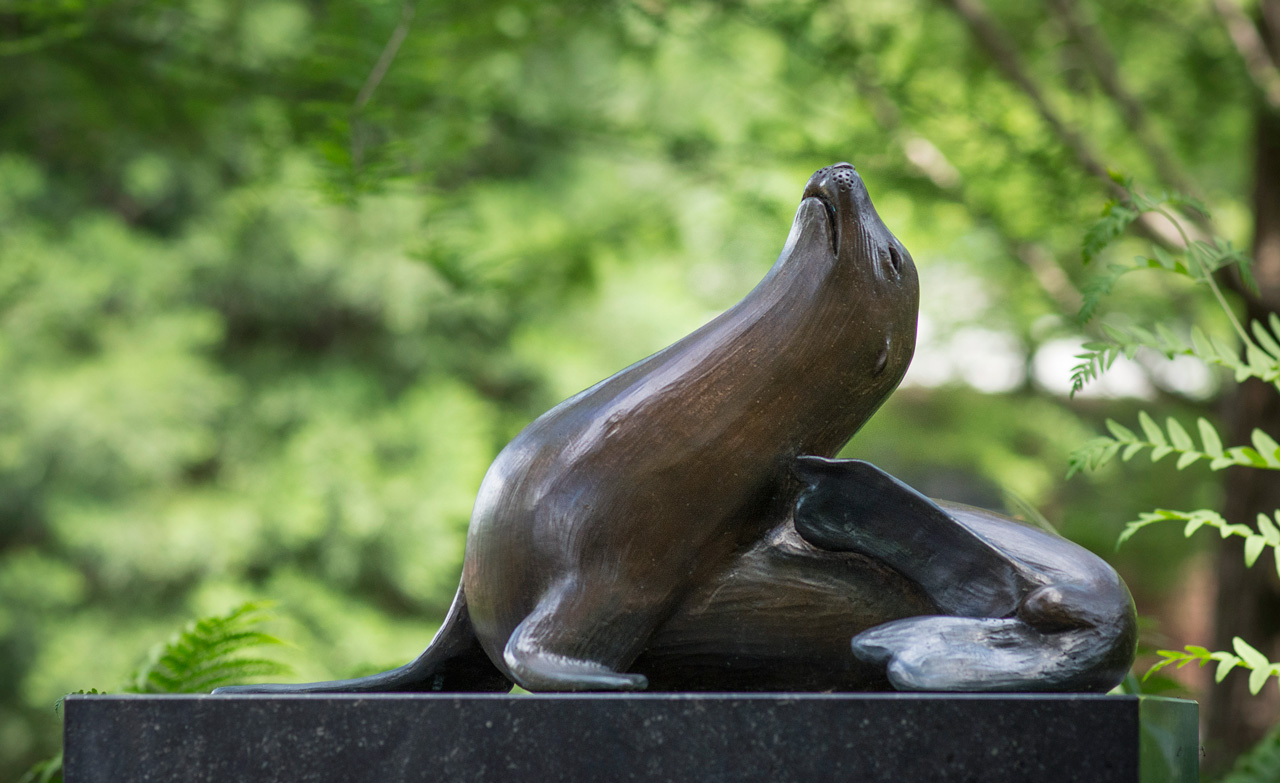
Bronze sea lion sculpture by Anthony Smith at Artis
