= Vogelpark Avifauna =

- Interactive map of Vogelpark Avifauna
- 52°08′23″N 4°38′57″E
- Date opened: 17 May 1950
- Location: Alphen aan den Rijn, South Holland, Netherlands
- Memberships: NVD and EAZA
- Major exhibits: Birds
- Website: Official website

Vogelpark Avifauna (English: Avifauna Bird Park) is a large bird park in Alphen aan den Rijn, in the western Netherlands. It was the first dedicated bird park in the world. The park has a lot of greenery and ponds, and also a restaurant and a children's playground.

== History ==
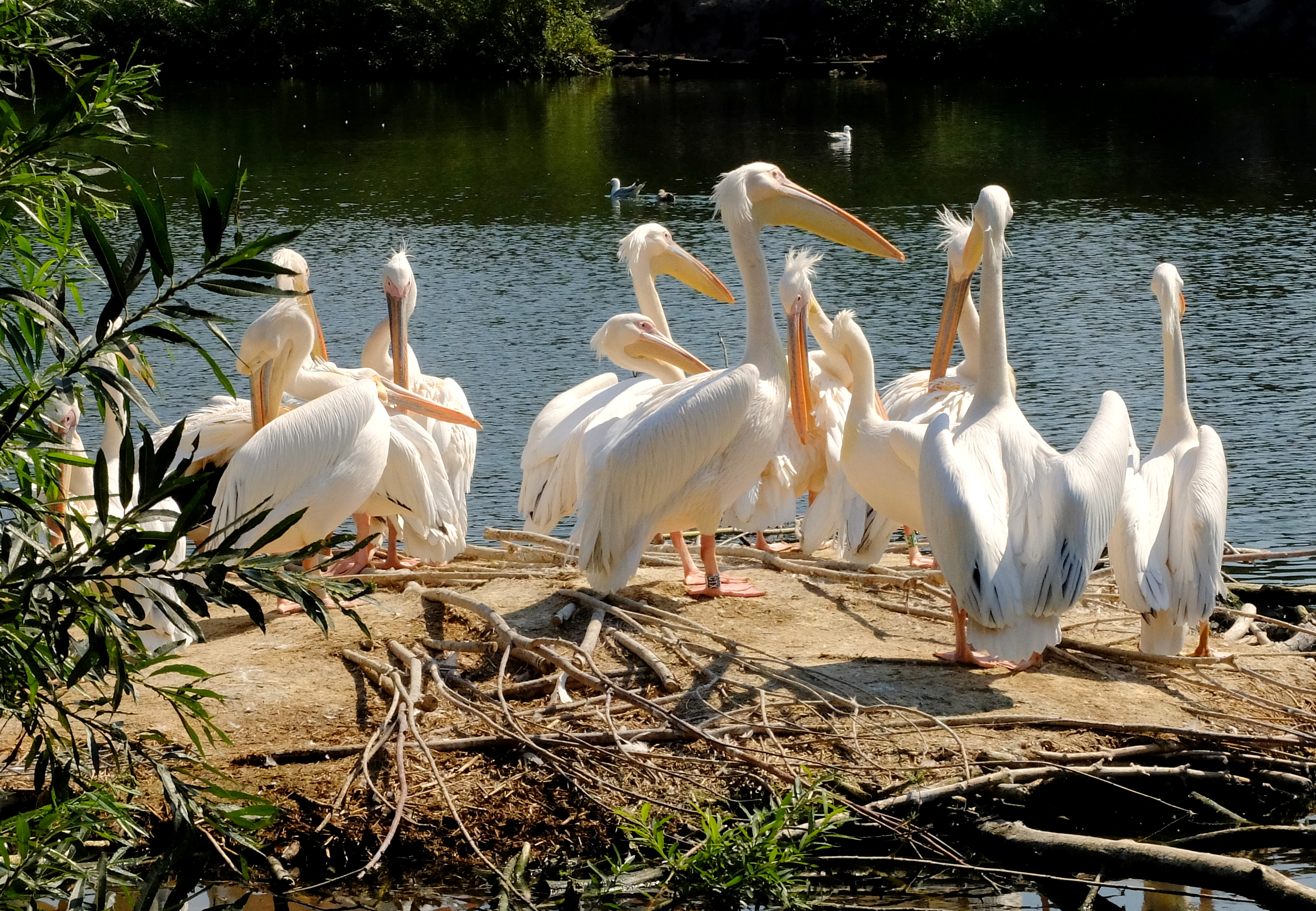
Pelicans

The zoo was set up in the garden of the Ten Rhijn estate by the owner, Van den Brink, and it was opened on 17 May 1950, the first bird park in the world. Toucans were featured on the posters for the park's opening, and a toucan has been depicted on the zoo's logo since, and also on the logos of the Van der Valk hospitality chain and Hotel Avifauna, which is situated on the edge of the park.

On the night of 23 December 2005 a fire broke out. About twenty birds were killed. The stables and an adjoining house were completely destroyed by the fire, and replacement buildings were completed in 2008.

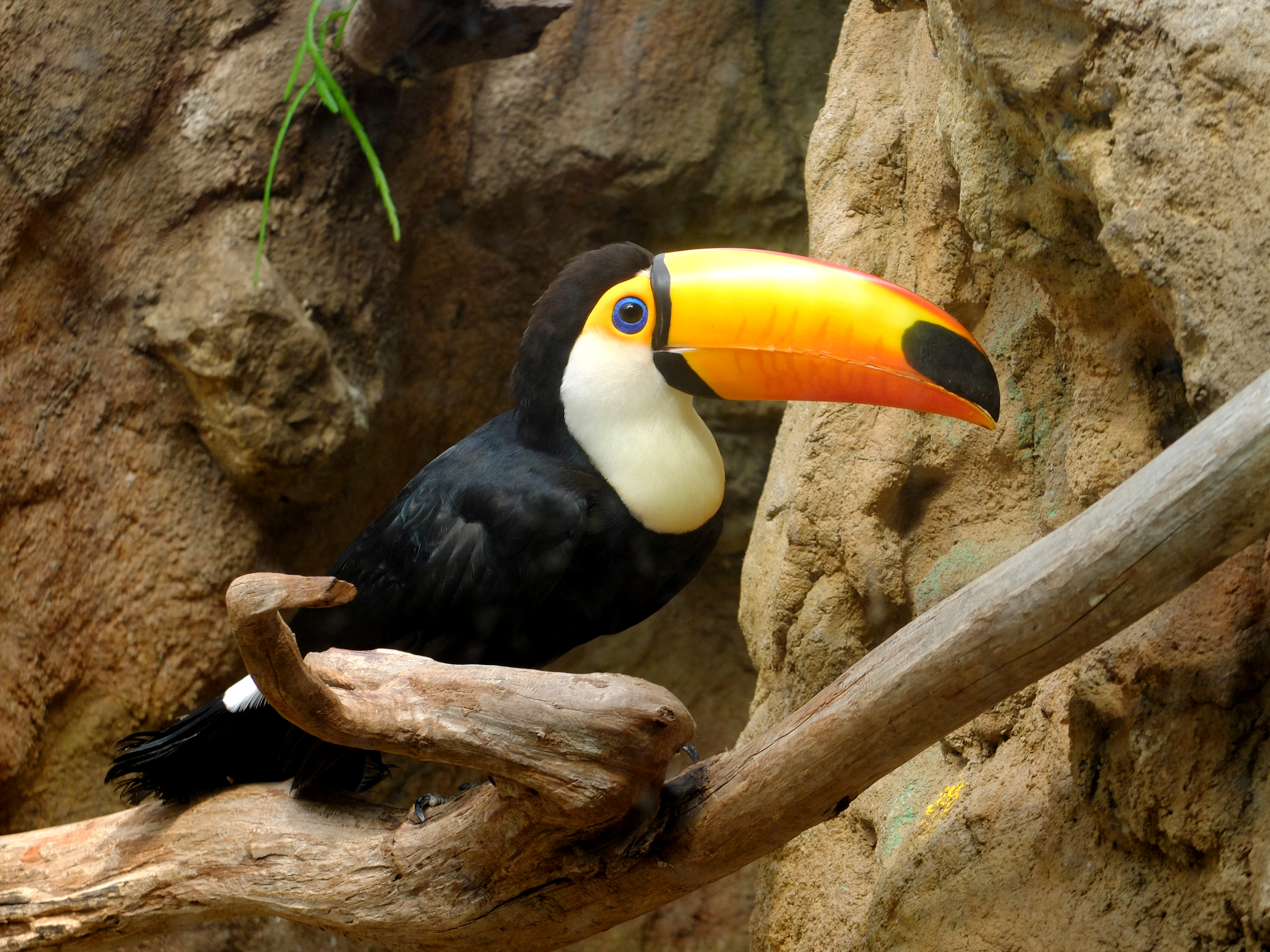
Toucan in Avifauna

In 2013 Avifauna separated from Van der Valk and became a foundation. From this moment onward, all revenue goes to the park and the animal care.

After that Avifauna kept improving the park. The first ever mammals in Avifauna arrived in 2014. Three species of prosimians made their entrance in the zoo.

Visitors of the park reacted positively to the prosimians. So Avifauna decided to open her doors to a different mammal in 2015. A few endangered red pandas found a new home in the zoo. They live in together with different Chinese birds. Avifauna is the first zoo to ever put red pandas together with birds.

The year after that, in 2016, Avifauna decided to open a new area in the zoo. An island named Nubose is now a popular part of the zoo. The prosimians live here, together with different kinds of birds and even wild guinea pigs.
