= Van der Valk (company) =

Dutch international hospitality chain

- Founded: 1939
- Founder: Martien van der Valk
- Headquarters: Netherlands,
- Key people: Arie van der Valk; Gerrit van der Valk (former CEO)
- Website: valk.com www.vandervalkhotelgroup.com/en valkexclusief.com

Van der Valk is a Dutch international hospitality chain run by the Van der Valk family. It is the largest Dutch hospitality chain, with more than 65 locations in the Netherlands and more than 15 in other countries. Besides hotels, Van der Valk also operates the Avifauna Bird Park in Alphen aan den Rijn. Its logo is based on the toucan.

The Van der Valk hotels are:

- 95 in Europe
  - 68 in the Netherlands
  - 13 in Germany
  - 9 in Belgium
  - 3 in France
  - 1 in Spain (Girona)
  - 1 in Turkey (Istanbul)
- 3 in North America
  - 1 in Bonaire (Kralendijk)
  - 1 in the United States (Hernando, Florida)

== History ==
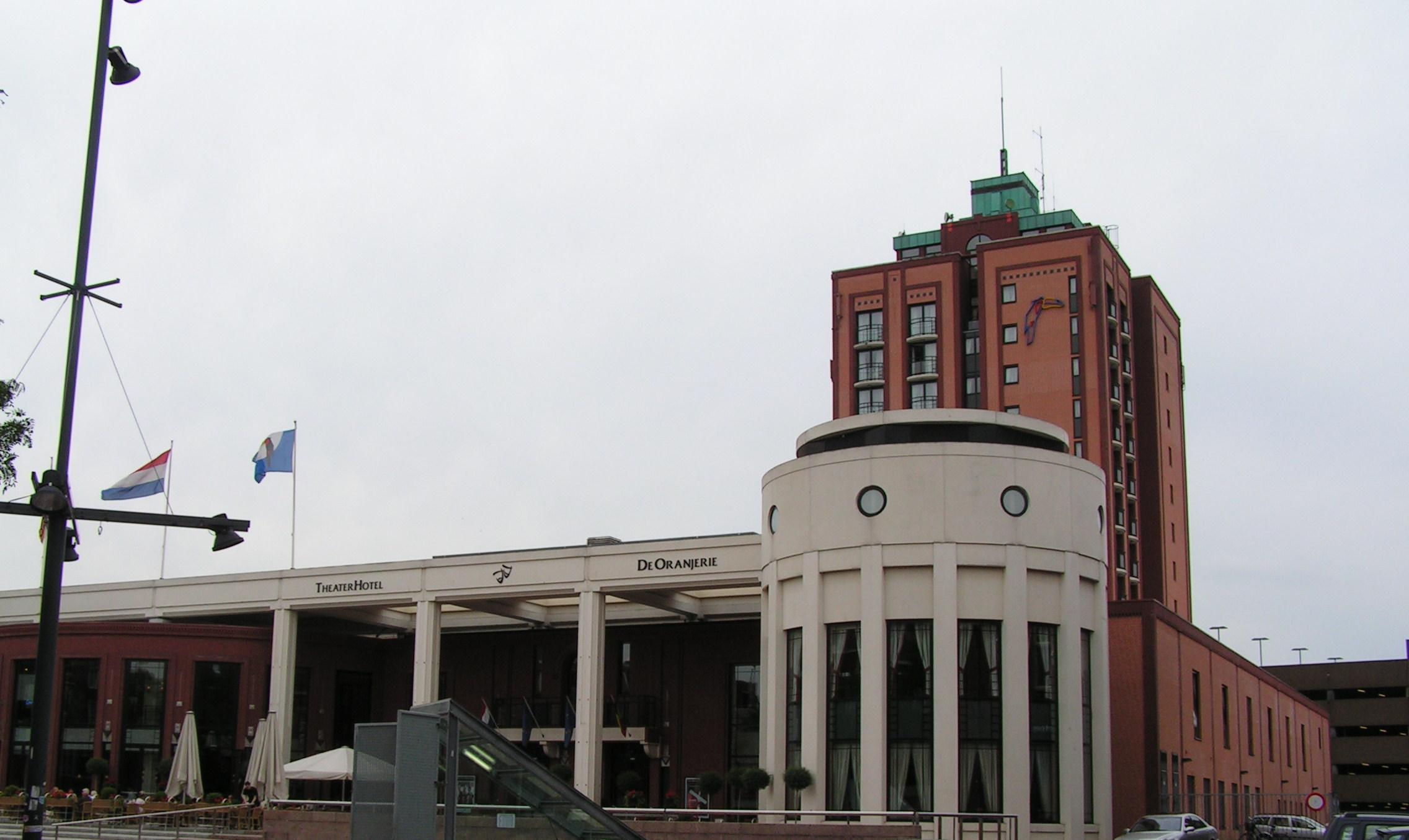
TheaterHotel De Oranjerie in Roermond, Netherlands

The chain was founded by Martien and Arie van der Valk in 1939 when they opened their first hotel (an expansion/upgrade of a former local restaurant in Voorschoten). After World War II the Van der Valks and their 11 children expanded the business with a number of hotel restaurants. This was continued by their grandchildren and great-grandchildren.

In 1982 Toos van der Valk, the wife of company head Gerrit van der Valk, was kidnapped by Italian criminals and held captive for 21 days. After a ransom of 13 million guilders was paid she was released.

In 1994 Gerrit van der Valk was arrested for tax evasion after it was found out that some workers were paid in cash, but he was released soon after. The case was eventually settled for 213 million guilders.

Gerrit van der Valk died in 2009.

The Van der Valk chain also received scrutiny from the authorities in the past because of bad labour conditions.

Since 2000 the chain is a franchise enterprise, but with the stipulation that every franchise holder must be a descendant of Martien van der Valk.

Arie van der Valk died on 11 January 2024.
