= Dutch Zoo Federation =

Dutch organization

The Dutch Zoo Federation (Nederlandse Vereniging van Dierentuinen - NVD) is an association of 13 large zoos in the Netherlands. NVD was founded in 1966. All of its member zoos are members of the European Association of Zoos and Aquaria (EAZA).

== Dutch member zoos ==
=== Current ===
- Apenheul in Apeldoorn
- Aqua Zoo Friesland in Leeuwarden
- Artis in Amsterdam
- Burgers' Zoo in Arnhem
- DierenPark Amersfoort in Amersfoort
- Wildlands Adventure Zoo Emmen in Emmen
- Dierenrijk in Mierlo
- Diergaarde Blijdorp in Rotterdam
- GaiaPark Kerkrade Zoo in Kerkrade
- Ouwehands Dierenpark in Rhenen
- Safaripark Beekse Bergen in Hilvarenbeek
- Vogelpark Avifauna in Alphen aan den Rijn
- Zoo Park Overloon in Overloon

=== Former ===
- Dolfinarium Harderwijk in Harderwijk (expelled in 2019 due to reports of animal abuse)

== See also ==
- List of zoo associations
