= BestZoo =

BestZOO
- BestZOO logo
- Interactive map of BestZOO
- 51.5292°N 5.4005°E
- Date opened: 1930
- Location: Best, Netherlands
- No. of species: 70+
- Annual visitors: 60,000 (2008)
- Website: bestzoo.nl

BestZOO is a small zoo in Best, North Brabant, Netherlands. It opened in 1930 as Vleut the Zoo, and was owned and operated by the van Laarhoven family until purchased by Zodiac Zoos in 2007. Zodiac Zoos upgraded many of the old exhibits to more naturalistic settings, but sold them to Jos Nooren in 2010 before all upgrades were completed.

The zoo participates in several European Association of Zoos and Aquaria (EAZA) European Endangered Species Programmes (EEP) programs, including Edwards's pheasant, black-and-white ruffed lemur, Colombian spider monkey and Sri Lankan leopard.

== History ==
BestZOO was opened in 1930 by Mr. van Laarhoven senior as Vleut the Zoo. At this time the zoo was home to primates, carnivores, and birds, including both native and exotic species. In 1982, van Laarhoven's two sons took over the zoo and ultimately expanded it to include about 70 species. By 2007, the zoo had been renamed BestZOO, and was taken over by Zodiac Zoos.

In July 2010, Zodiac Zoos decided that the park did not fit into its current holdings, and sold the zoo to Jos Nooren. Zodiac Zoos had planned to move the zoo, but these plans fell through and for now the zoo will remain in its current location. While owned by Zodiac Zoos, many of the exhibits were updated to more naturalistic settings. The new owner plans to continue improvements to the zoo.

== Animals ==
Animals at BestZOO include Sri Lankan leopard, lion, jaguar, cougar, European lynx, bobcat, caracal, serval, ocelot, Oriental small-clawed otter, meerkat, banded mongoose, yellow-throated marten, fennec fox, striped skunk, eastern spotted skunk, six-banded armadillo, big hairy armadillo, southern tamandua, Guianan squirrel monkeys, hamadryas baboon, black howler monkeys, rhesus macaque, tufted capuchin monkey, crab-eating macaque, white-faced saki, southern pig-tailed macaque, Colombian spider monkey, cottontop tamarin, red-handed tamarin, saddleback tamarin, white-lipped tamarin, golden-headed lion tamarin, pygmy marmoset, ring-tailed lemur, black-and-white ruffed lemur, white-fronted lemur, Japanese squirrel, chacoan mara, lowland paca, Central American agouti, striped hyena, common genet, binturongs, fossa, common raccoons, crab-eating raccoons, South American coati, white-nosed coati, lesser hedgehog tenrec, Grant's zebra, Chapman's zebra, llama, alpaca, Bactrian camel, Reeves's muntjac, Visayan spotted deer, sitatunga, mouflon, red kangaroo, Parma wallabies, Bennett's wallaby, white-striped dorcopsis, eastern wallaroo, western woolly opossum, Chilean flamingo, white stork, black stork, maguari stork, scarlet ibis, sacred ibis, buff-necked ibis, puna ibis, white-faced ibis, great white pelican, pink-backed pelican, little bittern, Eurasian oystercatcher, Spix's guan, blue-throated piping guan, bare-faced curassow, great curassow, helmeted curassow, masked lapwing, blacksmith lapwing, grey-winged trumpeter, helmeted guineafowl, vulturine guineafowl, golden pheasant, Edwards's pheasant, Siamese fireback, Himalayan monal, satyr tragopan, grey peacock-pheasant, ocellated turkey, snowy owl, great grey owl, Eurasian eagle owl, little owl, tawny owl, brown wood owl, barn owl, king vulture, common buzzard, Eurasian kestrel, American kestrel, crested caracara, black vulture, demoiselle crane, red-crowned crane, blue crane, grey crowned crane, spotted thick-knee, southern screamer, Allen's gallinule, Chilean tinamou, black swan, mandarin duck, Cape Barren goose, Inca tern, blue-and-yellow macaw, grey parrot, eclectus parrot, burrowing parrot, blue-fronted amazon, cockatiel, galah, orange-crested cockatoo, salmon-crested cockatoo, rainbow lorikeet, red-collared lorikeet, Australian king parrot, monk parakeet, red-crowned parakeet, green-cheeked parakeet, blue-bellied roller, lilac-breasted roller, channel-billed toucan, chestnut-mandibled toucan Papuan hornbill, silvery-cheeked hornbill, Abyssinian ground hornbill, southern ground hornbill, European kingfisher, kookaburra, European bee-eater, green oropendola, white-cheeked turaco, Eastern plantain-eater, common bronzewing, Victoria crowned pigeon, Eurasian hoopoe, tawny frogmouth, blue-faced honeyeater, red-billed blue magpie, green magpie, black-throated magpie-jay, emu, greater rhea, Darwin's rhea, African spurred tortoise, Hermann's tortoise, yellow-bellied slider, dwarf crocodile, American alligator, ball python, central bearded dragon, green iguana, Madagascar giant day gecko, and pumpkinseed.
