= DierenPark Amersfoort =

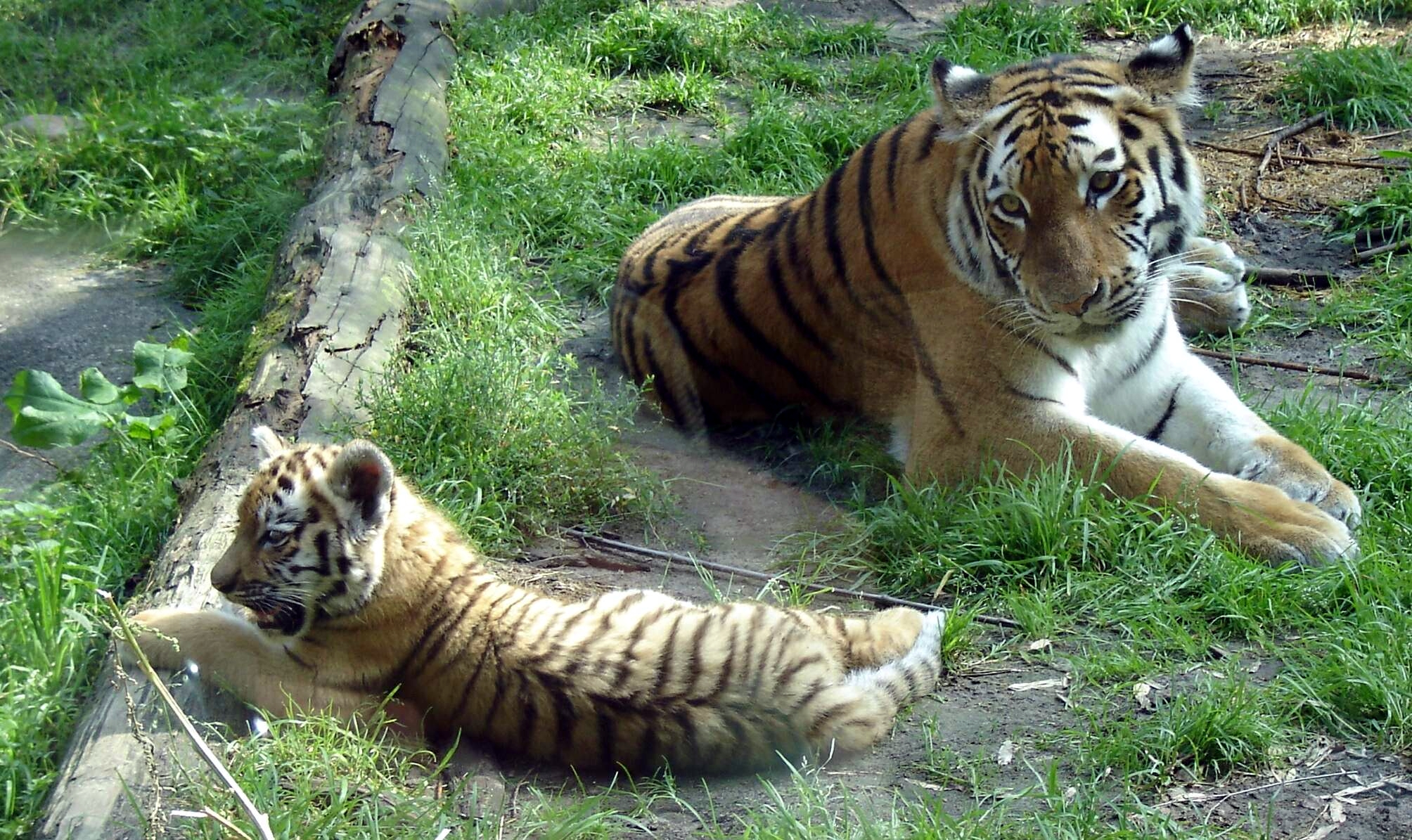
- Siberian tigers: Kira with a daughter
- Interactive map of DierenPark Amersfoort
- 52.150555°N 5.345°E
- Date opening: 22 May 1948
- Location: Amersfoort, Netherlands
- Land area: 20 hectares (49 acres)
- No. of species: 100
- Annual visitors: 800,000
- Memberships: EAZA, NVD
- Major exhibits: Exotic animals; Theme areas Savanna, The Night, Stad der Oudheid, DinoPark, Japanese garden
- Website: www.dierenparkamersfoort.nl

DierenPark Amersfoort is a 20-hectare (49-acre) zoo located on the West side of Amersfoort, in the province of Utrecht, on the edge of the Birkhoven forest, in the Netherlands.

== History ==
The zoo was founded on 22 May 1948 by Mr. Tertoolen and Mr. Knoester. Initially it was a very small zoo with a monkey, a bear, a camel and some farm animals. In the years afterwards the first carnivore arrived, and in 1956 the elephants Indra and Rani arrived.

In 1960, Mr. and Mrs. Vis-Tertoolen, one of the zoo founder's daughters and her husband, took over the management of the zoo, and the first of the chimpanzees arrived.

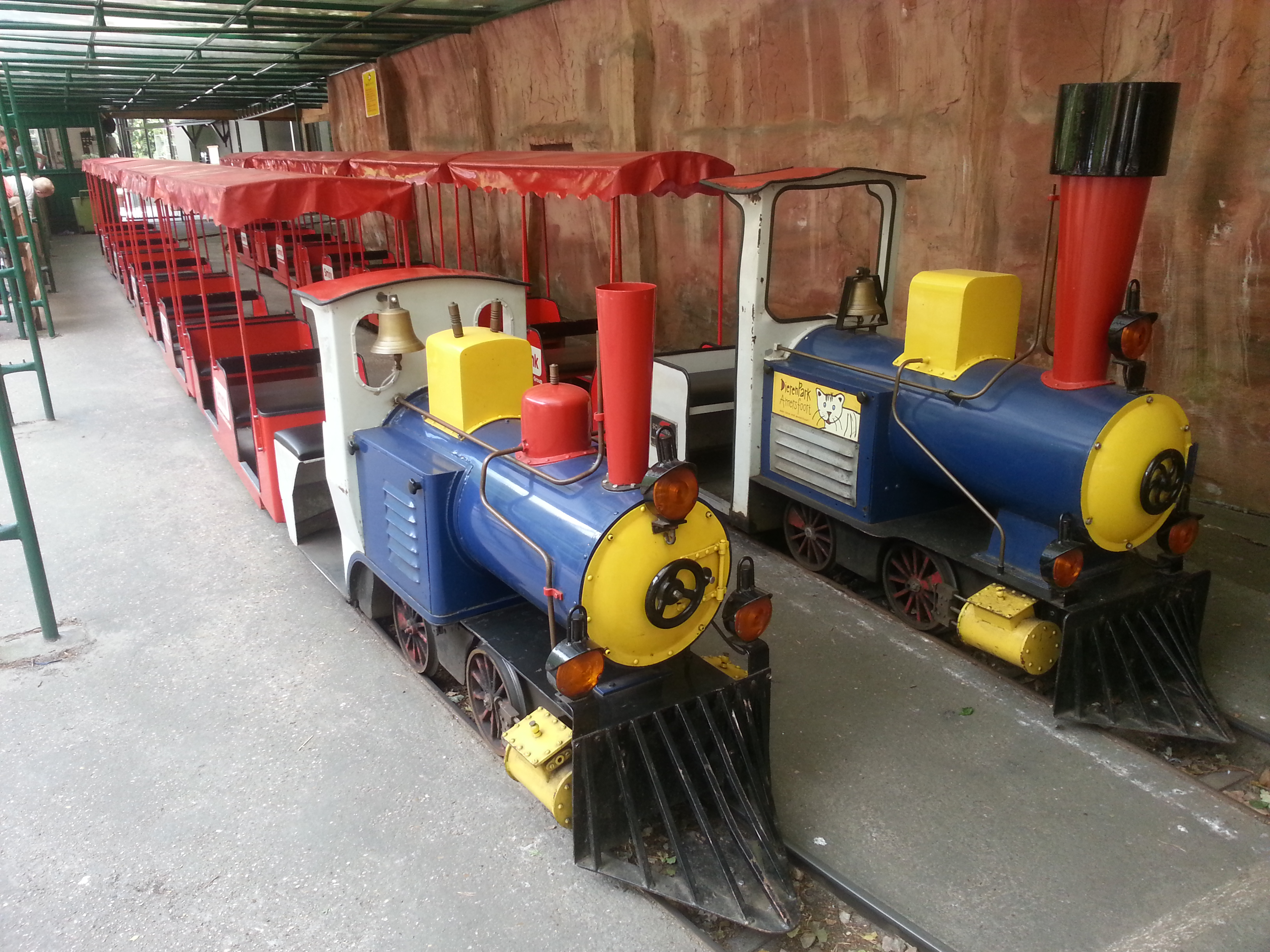
Dierenpark Amersfoort Train Ride

In 1979, 2 white southern white lions were born, but while growing up they became normally colored. In 1982 seven Sudan cheetahs were born. In 1988, the park got a savanna area and "De Ark van Amersfoort" (Amersfoort's Ark) was opened. The zoo currently has an area of about 20 hectares (49 acres). It is home to more than 100 animal species and hosts about 800,000 visitors annually. Its ridable miniature railway, has a worldwide unique gauge of 340 mm (13 3/8 in).

On September 4, 2019, the zoo's last white tiger, Maxie, died of lung cancer. She was 16 years old.

== Themed areas ==
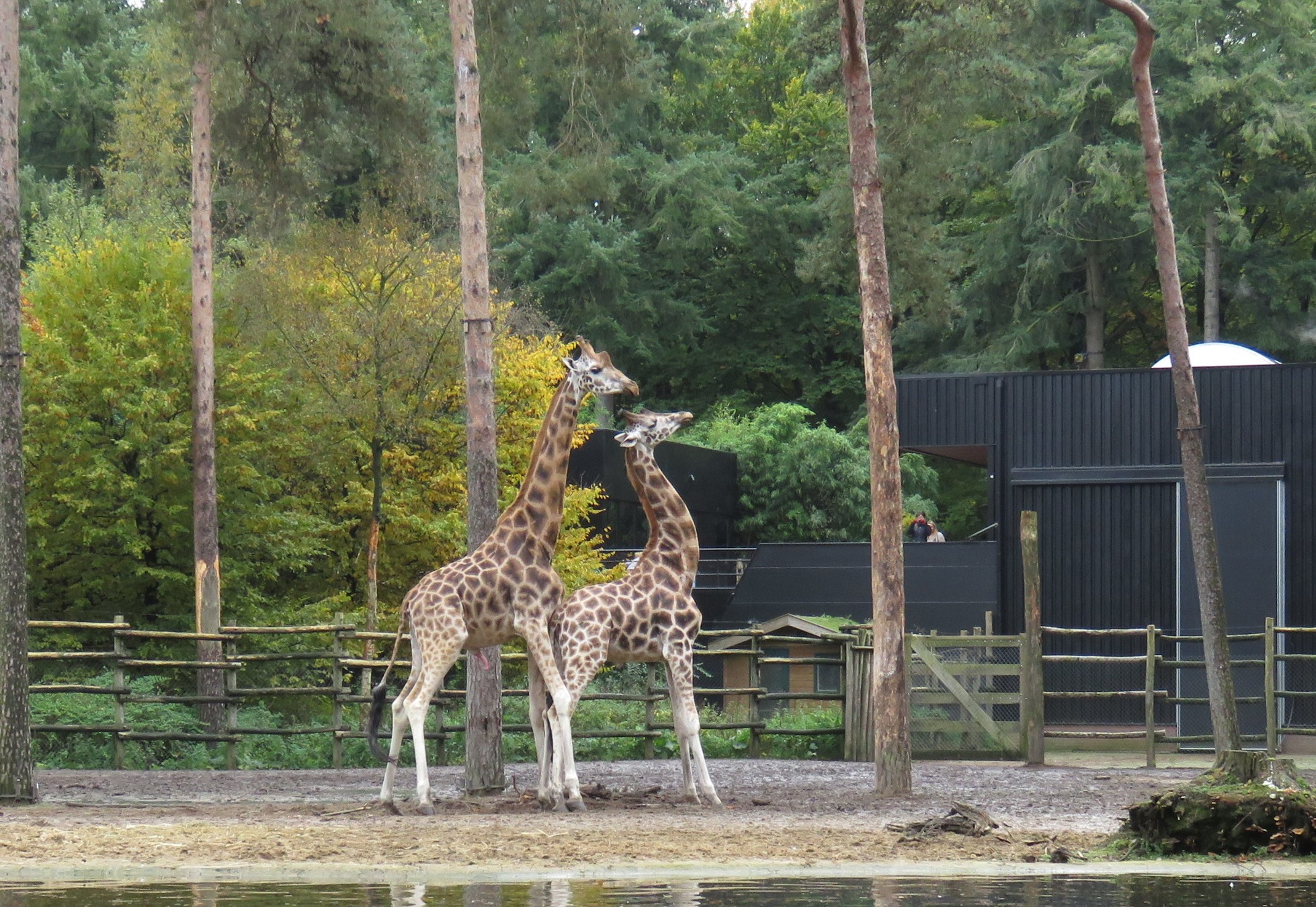
Giraffes

The park contains the following themed areas:

- The Savanna (since 1989)
Multiple animals live together on the 'Savanne'. These are a male group of northern giraffes, grévy zebras and helmeted guineafowls. The newest addition to the 'Savanne' are the impalas and the east African oryxes.

- Japanese garden (since 1994)

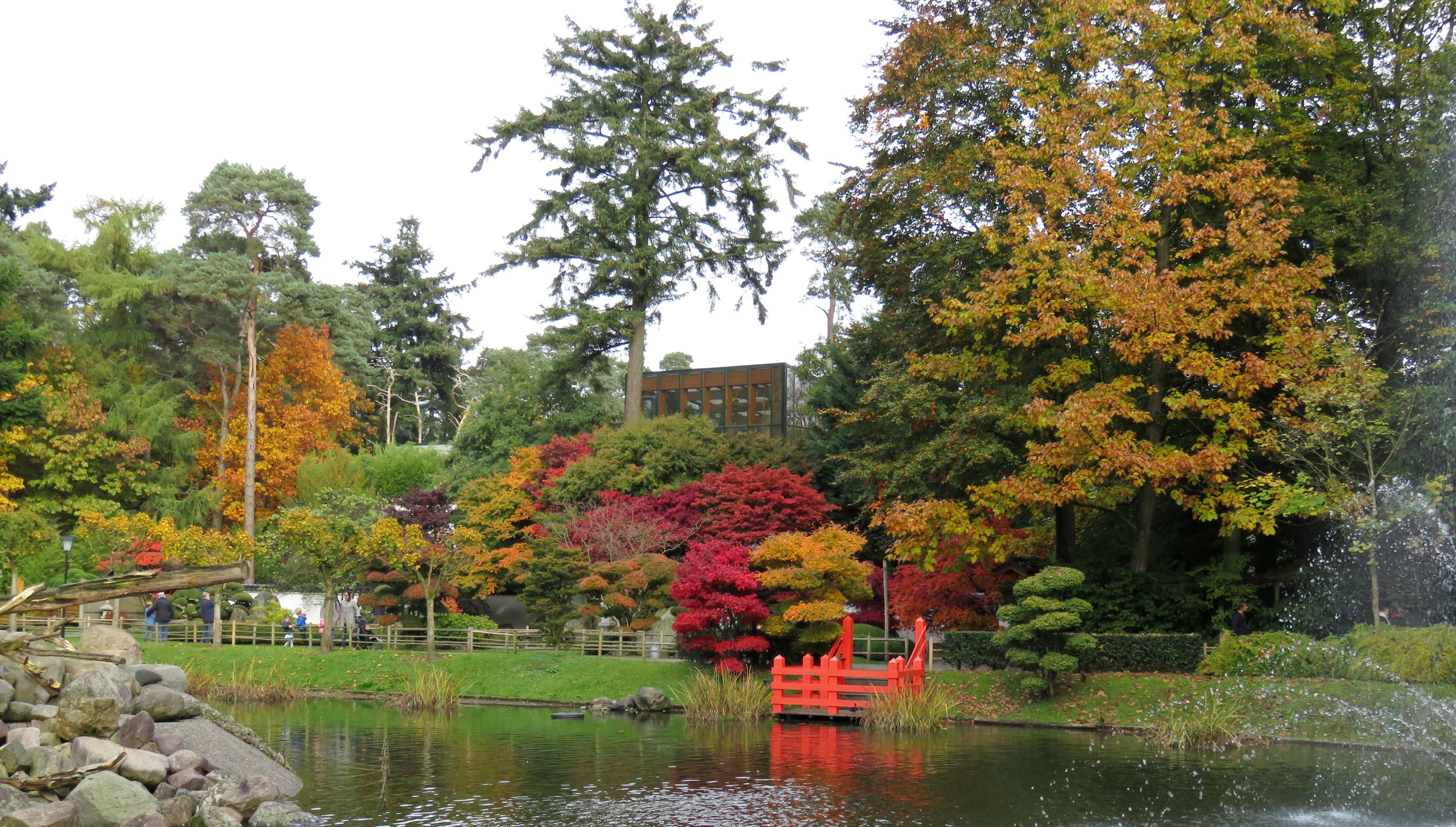
Fall in the Japanese garden

In the Japanese garden, where there is a possibility to calm down, leads a path to a pond, the home to the Koi carp, and ends at the home of the Japanese crane.

- De Stad der Oudheid (since May 1999)
This area that looks like the remains of an old town, provides a home for multiple animals. These are among others camels, lions, siberian tigers, hamadryas baboons and griffon vultures. A part of the latter group moved to the 'Snavelrijk' area in 2014.

- The Night (since 2003)
The biological rhythm in this building is turned around. Darkness appears during the day, and the other way around. This exhibit is full with nocturnal animals from Australia, South America and Africa, like the Linnaeus's two-toed sloth, common brushtail possum and three-striped night monkey.

- Het Rijk der Reuzen (since 2009)

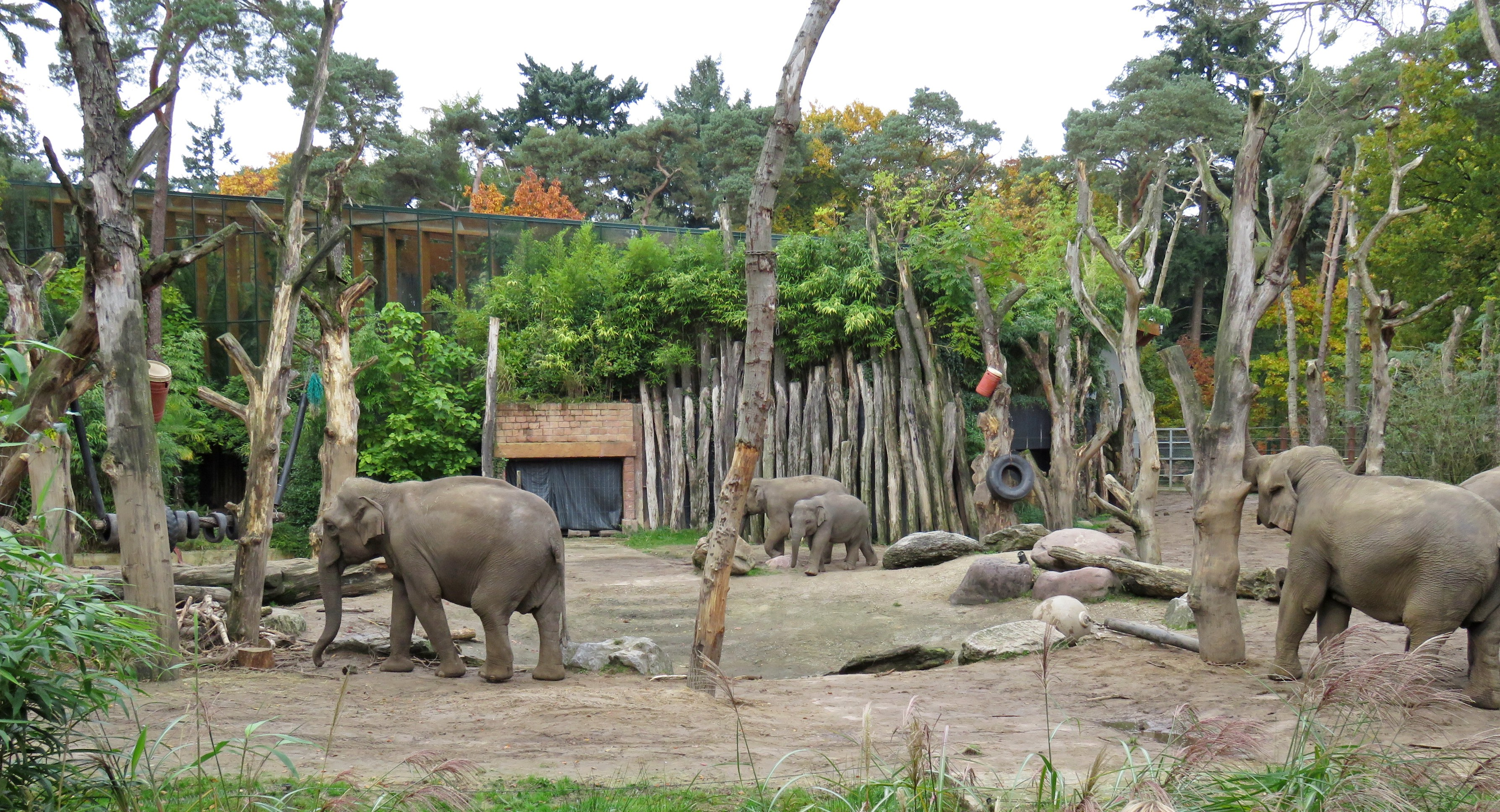
Outdoor area of DierenPark Amersfoort's elephants. F.l.t.r Indra, Kina, Kyan, Khine War War

The elephant's area is called 'Het Rijk der Reuzen'. The inside exhibit opened in 2009, and is with around 750 m^{2} the biggest inside exhibit in the Netherlands, and the third largest of Europe. The 3300 m^{2} outside exhibit opened 6 June 2010.

- De Grote Wildernis (since 2014)
This is an expansion area on the back side of the zoo. In 2014 Snavelrijk opened, making it the first step of the expansion. The second part of the expansion opened in July 2015, containing a water cycle trail called 'Expeditie Rivier', where visitors cycle next to exhibits and are able to see animals up-close.

- Het Woud (since 9 July 2016)
Here you visit a Dutch forest, with wolves, European badgers and garden dormouses.

== Animal collection ==
Below is an overview of the animal collection from DierenPark Amersfoort. The fishes and invertebrates lists are incomplete.

=== Mammals === Predators: Asian small-clawed otter (Amblonyx cinerea); Brown bear (Ursus arctos); Meerkat (Suricata suricatta); Yellow mongoose (Cynictis penicillata); Lion (Panthera leo); Siberian tiger (Panthera tigris altaica); Geoffroy's cat (Leopardus geoffroyi); Spotted hyena (Crocuta crocuta); Eurasian wolf (Canis lupus lupus); European badger (Meles meles meles); Red panda (Ailurus fulgens fulgens); Proboscidean: Asian elephant (Elephas maximus); Odd-toed ungulates: Mediterranean mini donkey; Grévy's zebra (Equus grevyi); Even-toed ungulates: Bactrian camel (Camelus ferus); Reticulated giraffe (Giraffa camelopardalis reticulata); Rothschild's giraffe (Giraffa camelopardalis rothschildi); Scimitar oryx (Oryx dammah); East African oryx (Oryx beisa); Impala (Aepyceros melampus); Barbary sheep (Ammotragus lervia); Dutch white goat; Somalian black headed sheep; Bentheim Black Pied pig; Bats: Egyptian fruit bat (Rousettus aegyptiacus); Xenarthra: Linnaeus's two-toed sloth (Choloepus didactylus); Marsupials: Feathertail glider (Acrobates pygmaeus); Tammar wallaby (Notamacropus eugenii); Woylie (Bettongia penicillata ogilbyi); Rodents: Coypu (Myocastor coypus); African brush-tailed porcupine (Atherurus africanus); Indian crested porcupine (Hystrix indica); Azara's agouti (Dasyprocta azarae); Black-tailed prairie dog (Cynomys ludovicianus); Garden dormouse (Eliomys quercinus); Golden spiny mouse (Acomys russatus); Malagasy giant rat (Hypogeomys antimena); Black rat (Rattus rattus); Primates: Chimpanzee (Pan troglodytes); Siamang (Symphalangus syndactylus); Hamadryas baboon (Papio hamadryas); Three-striped night monkey (Aotus trivirgatus); Golden-bellied capuchin (Cebus xanthosternos); Pygmy slow loris (Nycticebus pygmaeus); Golden-headed lion tamarin (Leontopithecus chrysomelas); Red ruffed lemur (Varecia rubra); Black-and-white ruffed lemur (Varecia variegata variegata); Japanese macaque (Macaca fuscata); Southern pig-tailed macaque (Macaca nemestrina); Ring-tailed lemur (Lemur catta); === Birds === Birds of prey and owls: Snowy owl (Nyctea scandica); Eurasian eagle-owl (Bubo bubo bubo); Griffon vulture (Gyps fulvus); Flightless birds: Common ostrich (Struthio camelus); Southern cassowary (Casuarius casuarius); Aquatic birds: African penguin (Spheniscus demersus); Chilean flamingo (Phoenicopterus chilensis); Black-crowned night heron (Nycticorax nycticorax); Little egret (Egretta garzetta garzetta); Dalmatian pelican (Pelecanus crispus); Hamerkop (Scopus umbretta); Glossy ibis (Plegadis falcinellus)	Northern bald ibis (Geronticus eremita); Southern screamer (Chauna torquata); Twente goose; Storks: Marabou stork (Leptoptilos crumenifer); Yellow-billed stork (Mycteria ibis); Poultry birds: Helmeted guineafowl (Numida meleagris); Himalayan monal (Lophophorus impejanus); Golden pheasant (Chrysolophus pictus); Cabot's tragopan (Tragopan caboti); Indian peafowl (Pavo cristatus); Barnevelder; Parrots: Red-crowned amazon (Amazona viridigenalis); Cockatiel (Nymphicus hollandicus); Monk parakeet (Myiopsitta monachus); Rose-ringed parakeet (Psittacula krameri); Sun parakeet (Aratinga solstitialis); Songbirds: Bali myna (Leucopsar rothschildi); Red fody (Foudia madagascariensis); Yellow-crowned bishop (Euplectes afer); Red-billed leiothrix (Leiothrix lutea); Scaly-breasted munia (Lonchura punctulata); Cranes: Red-crowned crane (Grus japonensis); Doves: Otidiphaps nobilis aruensis; === Reptiles === Lizards: Tiliqua scincoides (Tiliqua scincoides); Uromastyx acanthinura; Sauromalus ater; Gila monster (Heloderma suspectum); Solomon Islands skink (Corucia zebrata); Yellow-headed day gecko (Phelsuma klemmeri); Standing's day gecko (Phelsuma standingi); Common collared lizard (Crotaphytus collaris); Desert iguana (Dipsosaurus dorsalis); Spiny lizard; Brachylophus fasciatus; Rock monitor (Varanus albigularis); Chinese crocodile lizard (Shinisaurus crocodilurus); Panther chameleon (Furcifer pardalis); Crocodiles: Dwarf crocodile (Osteolaemus tetraspis); Snakes: Boa constrictor (Boa constrictor); Corn snake (Pantherophis guttatus); Common garter snake (Thamnophis sirtalis tetrataenia); Tortoises: Aldabra giant tortoise (Dipsochelys dussumieri); Kleinmann's tortoise (Testudo kleinmanni); === Amphibians === : Golden mantella (Mantella aurantiaca); Telmatobius culeus (Telmatobius culeus); Natterjack toad (Epidalea calamita); Neurergus kaiseri; Chinese fire belly newt (Hypselotriton orientalis); === Fishes === : Astyanax jordani; Cichlid (Cichlidae); Russian sturgeon (Acipenser gueldenstaedtii); Poecilia wingei; Koi (Cyprinus carpio carpio); === Invertebrates === : Idea leuconoe; Achatina fulica; Extatosoma tiaratum; Brachypelma smithi; Atta colombica (Atta sexdens)

== Incidents ==
On November 3, 2020, two male chimpanzees, Mike en Karibuna, escaped their enclosures due to human error. To prevent further escalation, the two male chimpanzees were shot. No visitors or employees were injured.
