= Species360 =

International non-profit organization

- Formation: 1973; 53 years ago
- Type: International not-for-profit organization
- Purpose: Zoo and aquarium animal records database
- Location: Bloomington, Minnesota, U.S.
- Region served: Global
- Method: Membership
- Website: www.species360.org
- Formerly called: International Species Information System (ISIS)

Species360 (formerly International Species Information System, abbreviated as ISIS), founded in 1974, is an international non-profit organization that maintains an online database of wild animals under human care. As of 2023, the organization serves more than 1,300 zoos, aquariums and zoological associations on six continents and in 102 countries worldwide. The organization provides its members with zoological data collection and management software called ZIMS—the Zoological Information Management System.

ZIMS project was a large global collaboration with 600 people contributing under the leadership of Nate Flesness, Executive Director of Species360 (1979–2009), and Hassan Syed, CIO of Species360 (2003–2010). The ZIMS database contains information on 22,000 species, 10 million animals, and 82 million medical records. Members use the basic biologic information (age, sex, parentage, place of birth, circumstance of death, etc.) collected in the system to care for and manage their animal collections (including demographic and genetic management in many cases). It is also used for ex situ breeding programs and supporting conservation research and programs.

Since its foundation in 1973, the group has been a Non-Governmental Organization (NGO) pursuing wild animal conservation goals. Species360 works in partnership with zoo associations around the world.

The organization has staff and representatives in Amsterdam and The Randstad (the Netherlands), Barcelona (Spain), Copenhagen and Odense (Denmark), Jerusalem (Israel), Bristol, London, and Paignton (UK), and across the United States (Arizona, California, Florida, Illinois, Massachusetts, Michigan, Missouri, Texas, Wisconsin, Washington) with headquarters in Minnesota (US).

== Centralized database ==
Modern zoos and aquariums often are "gene banks" for endangered species. In some cases, species which have become extinct in the wild and have been bred in zoos are eventually returned to the wild. Examples include the black-footed ferret, California condor, Przewalski's horse, red wolf, Micronesian kingfisher (not yet reintroduced), and the Arabian oryx. Individual zoos generally do not have the space to maintain a viable species population (which for many mammals and birds requires 500+ animals in order to maintain sufficient genetic diversity), so maintaining genetic diversity requires coordination between many zoos. Scientific expertise on husbandry, nutrition, veterinary care and so on is spread throughout the zoos and aquaria of the world. Breeding and population management relies on accurate information about animals in all member institutions, especially pedigree history (parentage) and demography (births and deaths).

Species360 records are accepted by international regulatory bodies such as CITES. Roughly three-quarters of Association of Zoos and Aquariums (AZA) members in North America are members, and the European Association of Zoos and Aquaria (EAZA) requires its members to join. The World Association of Zoos and Aquaria's (WAZA) Conservation Strategy Guidelines strongly recommend that all zoo and aquaria join and participate in data sharing via ZIMS.

== Software ==
ZIMS (Zoological Information Management System) for Husbandry:

A comprehensive information application designed to manage information about animal accessions and dispositions, animals wanted and available, behavioral observations, feed logs, and much more. ZIMS for Inventory and Husbandry also generates information needed for CITES and other permitting and governmental uses. It is designed for use by curators, registrars, keepers and other animal care staff. The ZIMS application is the world's first and only real-time, unified global database for animals in zoos and aquariums.

ZIMS for Medical:

A web-based record-keeping system that captures records about anesthesia, treatment, diagnostic testing, clinical observations and more. Powerful enough to replace any other third-party medical records application, it also identifies species-specific physiologic reference data and commonly used anesthesia drugs, dosages and potential risks for thousands of wildlife species. ZIMS for Medical is designed for use by veterinarians, vet techs, keepers, and other staff working with a veterinary team. Now featuring Sample Storage to help zoo, aquarium, and other wildlife veterinarians manage biological samples for animal care and species conservation.

ZIMS for Studbooks:

A web-based record-keeping system used by studbook keepers at zoos, aquariums, and zoological associations to manage the genetics of small populations. The solution is a global, integrated, real-time studbook database that connects institutional and studbook records, making studbooks more robust and up-to-date, making the studbook keeper’s job easier, and improving species management.

ZIMS for Aquatics:

A web-based record-keeping system that combines best-in-class enclosure and animal records management with data-driven insights to marine and freshwater species.

ZIMS for Education:

is made available for licensing to educational organizations teaching animal husbandry, zoo, and aquarium science. The educational version of ZIMS provides a teaching platform and practice database through which students can enter and manipulate their own data and access that of other educational institutions. LearnZIMS uses a fictitious dataset to teach application functionality and to demonstrate the types of data that are collected in the global database.

Hortis by Species360

The only cloud-based plant collection software in the world, helping users keep track of their plant collection wherever they are, using a mobile, tablet, or PC. With its software design, Hortis allows all members of the institution to collaborate, share and engage with their plant collection data using garden maps, capturing photos, and analyzing their plant collection data.

Conservation Science Alliance:

The Species360 Conservation Science Alliance works alongside international conservation, research, and academic institutions to answer questions critical to saving species using deep data reserves to drive conservation action. Developers of the first Species Knowledge Index (SKI) that maps available knowledge for the world's tetrapods.

== Members ==
Regional association members include:

- American Association of Zoo Keepers (AAZK)
- American Association of Zoo Veterinarians (AAZV)
- Asociación Colombiana de Parques Zoológicos y Acuarios (ACOPAZOA)
- Asociación de Zoológicos Criaderos y Acuarios de México (AZCARM)
- Asociación Ecuatoriana de Zoológicos y Acuarios (AEZA)
- Asociación Latinoamericana de Parques Zoológicos y Acuarios (ALPZA)
- Asociación Mesoamericana y del Caribe de Zoológicos y Acuarios (AMAZOO)
- Associação Portuguesa de Zoos e Aquária (APZA)
- Asociación Venezolana de Parques Zoológicos y Acuarios (AVZA)
- Association of British and Irish WIld Animal Keepers (ABWAK)
- Association Française des Parcs Zoologiques (AFdPZ)
- Association of Zoos & Aquariums (AZA)
- Brazilian Association of Zoos and Aquariums (AZAB)
- British and Irish Association of Zoos and Aquariums (BIAZA)
- Canadian Accredited Zoos and Aquariums (CAZA)
- Central Zoo Authority of India (CZA)
- Danish Association for Zool Gardens and Aquaria (DAZA)
- Eurasian Regional Association of Zoos & Aquariums (EARAZA)
- European Association of Zoos & Aquaria (EAZA)
- Florida Association of Zoos and Aquariums (FAZA)
- Iberian Association of Zoos & Aquaria (AIZA)
- Israel Nature & Parks Authority (INPA)
- Israeli Zoo Association (IZA)
- Japanese Association of Zoos and Aquariums (JAZA)
- Korean Association of Zoos and Aquariums (KAZA)
- Malaysian Association of Zoological Parks & Aquaria (MAZPA)
- Nederlandse Vereniging van Dierentuinen (NVD)
- Nigerian Association of Zoological Gardens and Wildlife Parks (NAZAP)
- Pan-African Association of Zoos and Aquaria
- Perhimpunan Kebun Binatang - Indonesian Zoo & Aquarium Association (PKBSI)
- Polish Association of Directors of Zoos & Aquaria (PZDA)
- Romanian Zoo & Aquarium Federation (RZAF)
- Russian Union of Zoos & Aquaria (RUZA)
- South-East Asia Zoos Association (SEAZA)
- Swedish Association of Zoos & Aquaria (SAZA)
- Taiwan Aquarium & Zoo Association (TAZA)
- Thai Zoological Park Organization Under The Royal Patronage of HM The King (ZPO)
- Ukrainian Association of Zoos & Aquariums (UAZA)
- Unione Italiana Giardini Zoologici e Acquari (UIZA)
- Verband der Zoologischen Gärten (VdZ) e.V.
- Vietnam Zoo and Aquarium Association (VZA)
- Wildlife Animal Rescue Network (WARN - ASIA)
- Wildlife Preservation Canada (WPC)
- World Association of Zoos and Aquariums (WAZA)
- Zoo Aquarium Association (ARAZPA Inc) (ZAA)
- Zoological Association of America (ZAA)
- Zooschweiz - Swiss Association of Scientific Zoos

== History ==
In 1973, Ulysses Seal and Dale Makey proposed the International Species Information System (ISIS) as an international database to help zoos and aquariums accomplish long-term conservation management goals. It was founded in 1974 with an initial membership of 51 zoos in North America and Europe, and its membership has increased every year since. Grants and endorsements were provided by the Association of Zoos and Aquariums (AZA), the American Association of Zoo Veterinarians (AAZV) and other zoological associations. The founders also raised development funding from private foundations and the United States Department of the Interior. For the first 30 years, the Minnesota Zoo hosted the program on their grounds.

Since 1989, the organisation has been incorporated as a non-profit entity under an international Board of Trustees elected by subscribing member institutions. In 2016, the organization was renamed as Species360 due to ISIS being used as an abbreviation of the Islamic State of Iraq and Syria — an Islamic terrorist organization that attracted global mass media attention.

== See also ==
- List of zoo associations
