= Zodiac Zoos =

Zoo in the Netherlands

Zodiac Zoos logo

Zodiac Zoos (officially Zodiac Zoos B.V.) is a Dutch corporation that owns and operates Aqua Zoo Friesland, Zoo Wissel, Zoo Labyrinth Boekelo, Zoo Park Overloon, and Castle Arcen.

The Zodiac Animals Foundation manages the animal collection of the Zodiac Zoos, which includes agile mangabeys, pygmy hippopotamuses, ruffed lemurs, cheetahs, ring-tailed lemurs, Parma wallaby, Kirk's dik-dik, binturong, Von der Decken's hornbill, cotton-top tamarins, white-cheeked gibbons, lion-tailed macaques, and Humboldt penguins.

Zodiac Zoos, together with the Van Hall Institute of the College Zoo in Leeuwarden have created an internship program in which animal management students can intern at one of the Zodiac zoos.

== History ==
Zodiac Zoos owned BestZoo, a small zoo in Best, between 2007 and July 2010, when it was sold to Jos Nooren.

== Conservation ==
Together the zoos participate in more than 25 European Endangered Species Programmes (EEP) and 20 European Studbooks (ESB). European Studbooks maintained by Zodiac Zoos include the black crowned crane (Balearica pavonina) and the black-eared marmoset (Callithrix penicillata).

== The zoos ==
Aqua Zoo Friesland opened in 2003, and is located in Leeuwarden. It specializes in aquatic animals, and is a member of the European Association of Zoos and Aquaria (EAZA) and Dutch Zoo Federation (NVD). Animals at the zoo include seals, penguins, wallabies, flamingos, dwarf otters, ocelots, beavers, and pelicans.

Castle Arcen (Kasteeltuinen Arcen) is a historic castle with gardens and a zoo. Animals in the zoo include squirrel monkeys, cockatiels, diamond dove, Japanese quail, helmet guinea fowl, black swans, crested screamer, flamingos, European storks, koi, carp, salmon trout, beluga sturgeon, European eagle owl, green macaw, blue yellow macaw, demoiselle crane, marabou, and Von der Decken's tok.

Zoo Labyrinth Boekelo was opened in 2005, and is located near Enschede in the province of Overijssel, the Netherlands. This facility includes a series of labyrinths and mazes that test the senses and help teach about nature. It also includes a butterfly garden. closed in 2012

Zoo Park Overloon is a 21-acre (8.5 ha) park in Overloon, in the province of North Brabant, Netherlands. The zoo is a member of the European Association of Zoos and Aquaria (EAZA) and Dutch Zoo Federation (NVD). Animals at the zoo include cheetahs, tapirs, gibbons, flamingos, giant anteaters, red pandas, reindeer, bears, marten, straw-necked ibis, lemurs, Indian antelope, and kangaroos.

Zoo Wissel is a small Dutch zoo in Wissel, near Epe in the province of Gelderland, Netherlands. It specializes in small animals, and is a member of the European Association of Zoos and Aquaria (EAZA) and Dutch Zoo Federation (NVD). Animals at the zoo include marabou, pygmy hippos, flamingos, cranes, dik-diks, white-faced saki, red pandas, squirrel monkeys, bear, marten, and ringtail lemurs. Plans are in place to move the zoo to a new location and rename it "Pangea Parc".
