= Micropia (museum) =

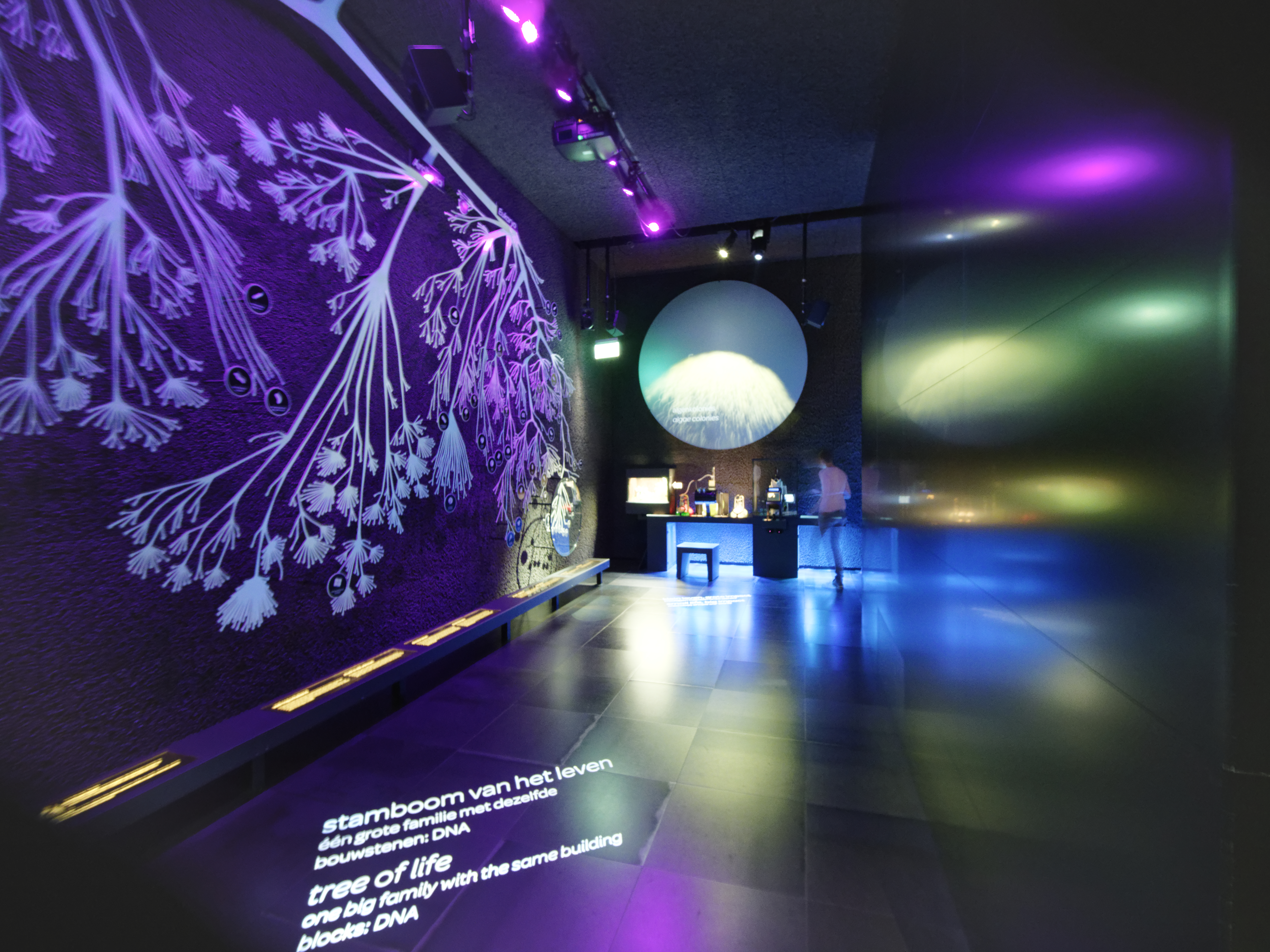
- Lobby

- Location within the city center of Amsterdam
- Location: Plantage Kerklaan 38-40; Amsterdam, Netherlands
- Coordinates: 52.366898°N 4.912555°E
- Type: museum
- Website: http://www.micropia.nl/en/

Micropia is a museum in Amsterdam based on the idea of distributing information about microbes, which are often associated with illness and disease despite their essential function in the daily functioning of human life. The museum opened on 30 September 2014 and is a separate museum which is part of Artis Zoo. It claims to be the first of its kind.

The two main focuses for Micropia are: establishing a positive view of microbes and “becoming also an international platform for microbiology that brings diverse interest groups together in order to bridge the gap between science and the general public”. One of the basic premises for the museum is to encourage a more positive relationship between microbes and the general public because they believe that this will encourage more study and research into “micro-nature.”

Many of the exhibits in Micropia focus on microbes’ existence in daily life. It consists of both living microbes as well as virtual representations of microbes. The Kiss-O-Meter, for example, measures how many microbes are shared between two people as they kiss.

== Gallery ==
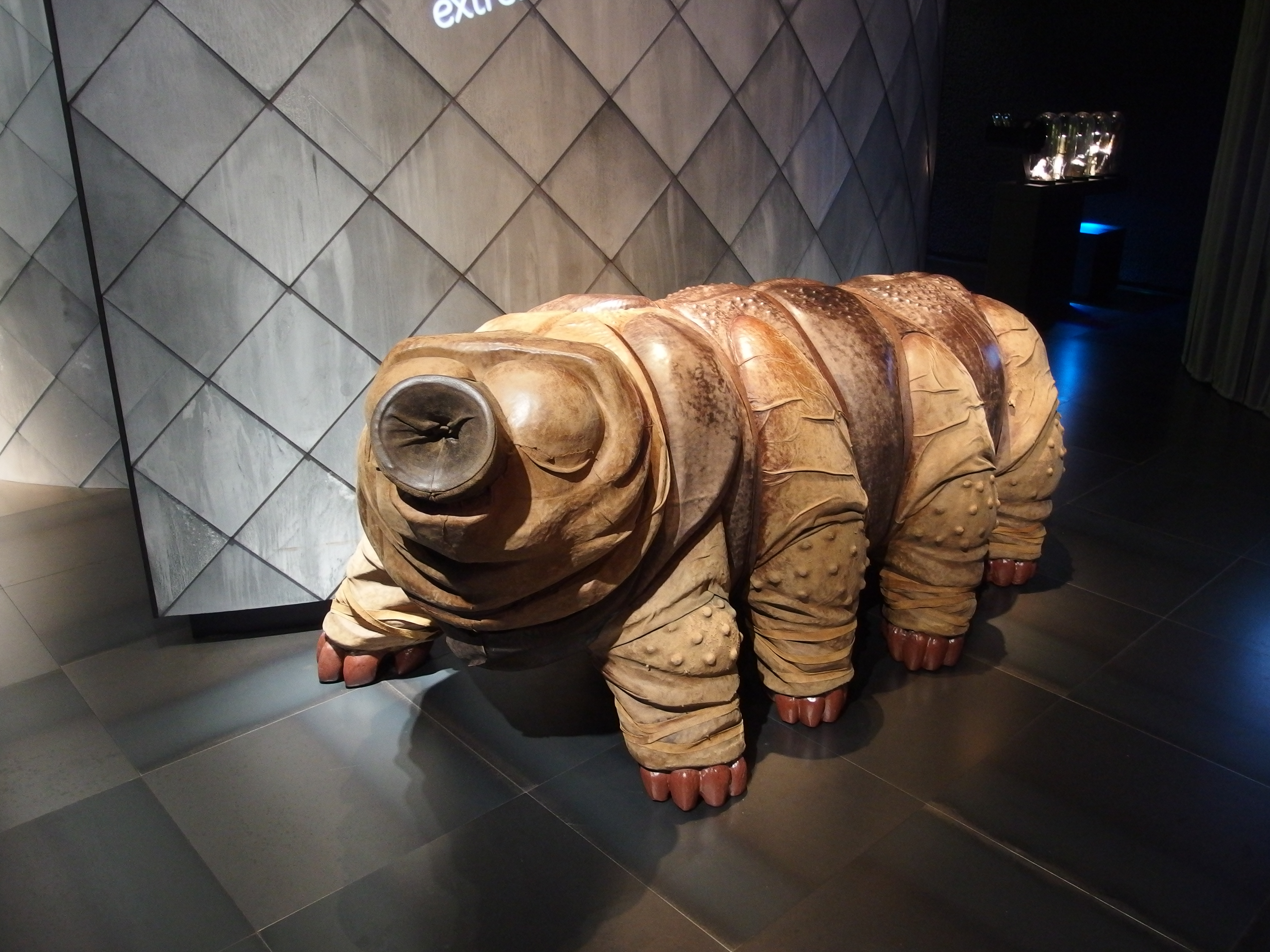

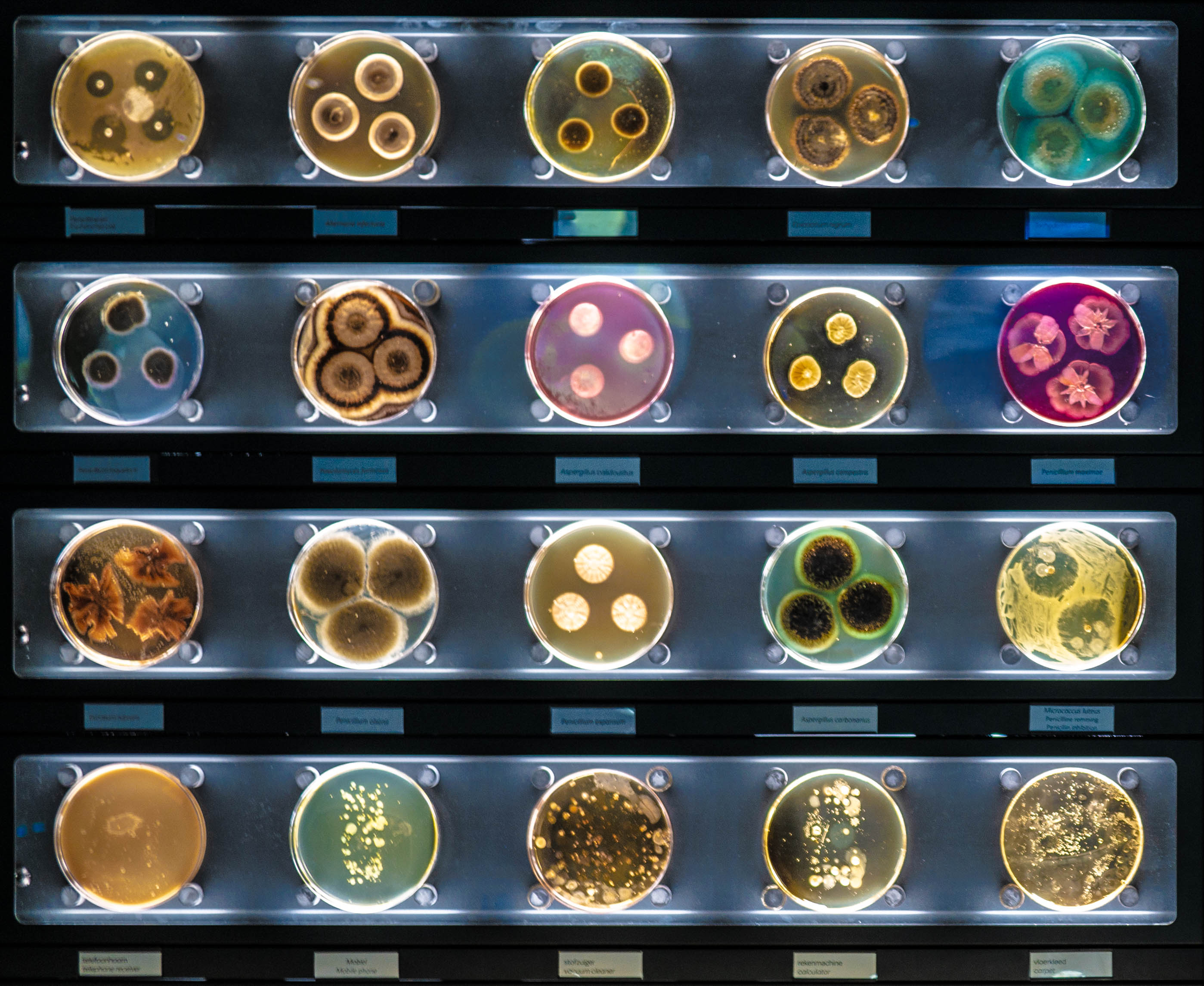

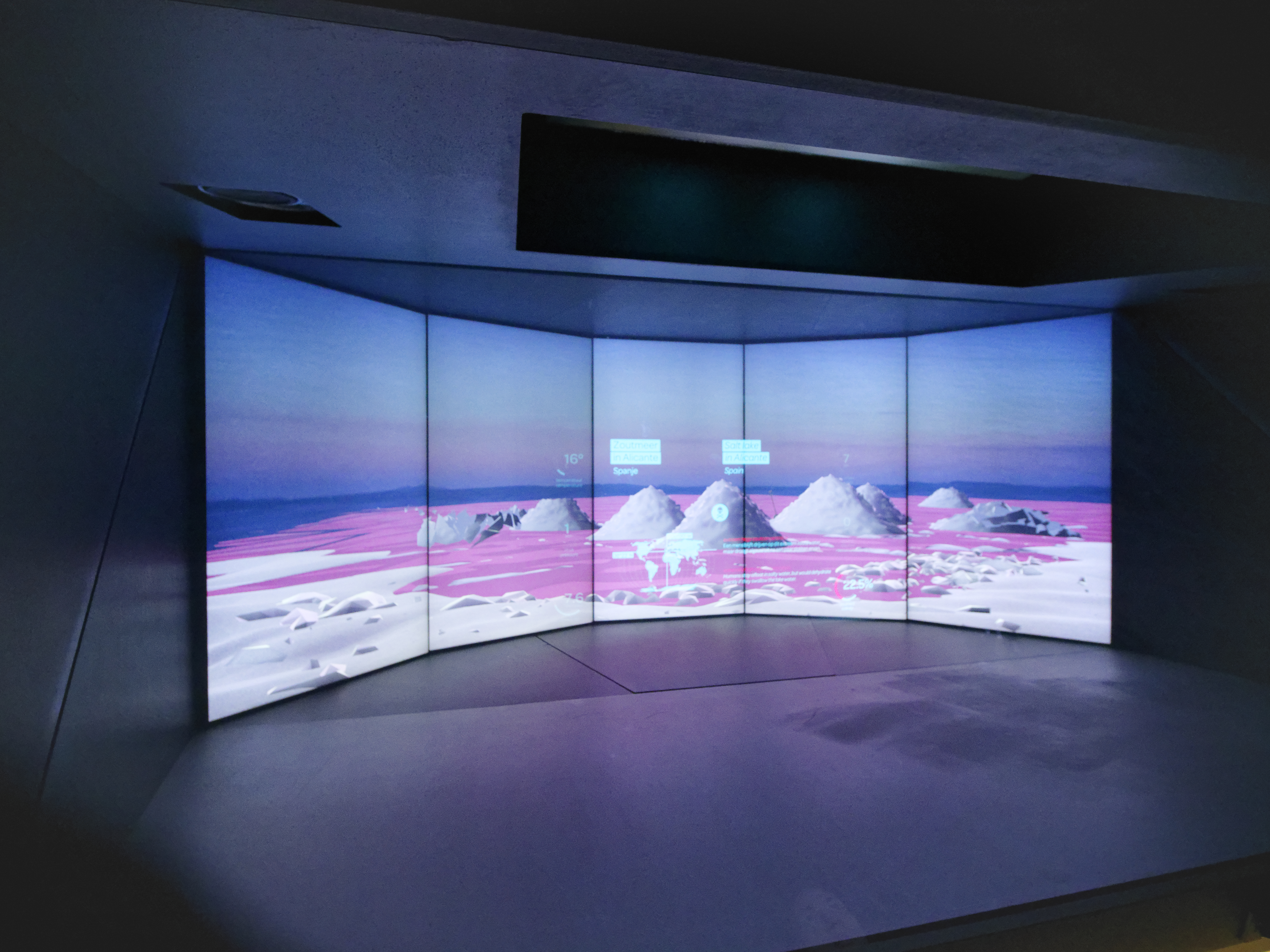

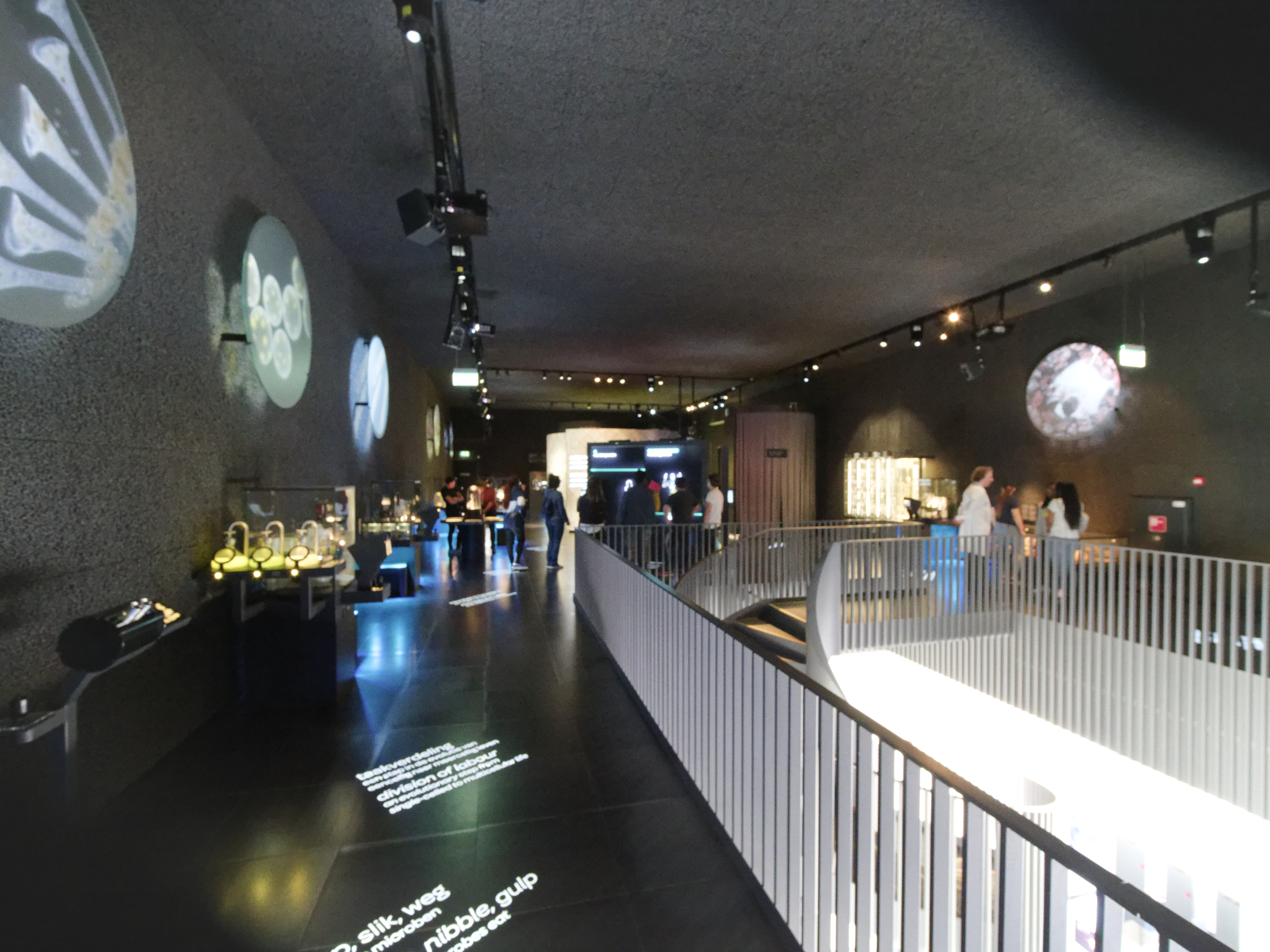
