= GaiaZOO =

- Interactive map of GaiaZOO
- 50°52′10″N 6°2′58″E
- Date opening: 1 June 2005
- Location: Kerkrade
- Land area: 25 hectares (62 acres)
- No. of species: approx. 100
- Website: www.gaiazoo.nl

GaiaZOO is a Dutch zoo located in Kerkrade. It opened in 2005 as GaiaPark with approximately 80 different species. In 2014, the zoo had approximately 100 different species.

== Naming ==
GaiaZOO is named after Gaia, the Greek goddess of the Earth. It also refers to the Gaia hypothesis which proposes the Earth is one big living organism. This organism includes all of Earth's fauna, flora, water, sky and surface.

== Species ==
GaiaZOO has approximately 100 different species. Besides traditional zoo animals such as gorillas, rhinoceroses, lions and zebras, GaiaZOO has some species which cannot be found in other Dutch zoos such as Amazon bush dogs, wolverines and bat-eared foxes.

== EAZA and breeding programmes ==
GaiaZOO is member of the European Association of Zoos and Aquaria (EAZA) and participates in breeding programs.

In 2014, three lion cubs were born and were named after the daughters of the Dutch king Willem-Alexander. Unfortunately, on Koningsdag the adult lions killed and ate the cubs.

== DinoDome ==
In May 2009, GaiaZOO opened Europe's biggest indoor dinosaur-themed playground named DinoDome with a surface size of 2,500 square metres (27,000 sq ft).
