= Association of Zoos and Aquariums =

North American nonprofit organization

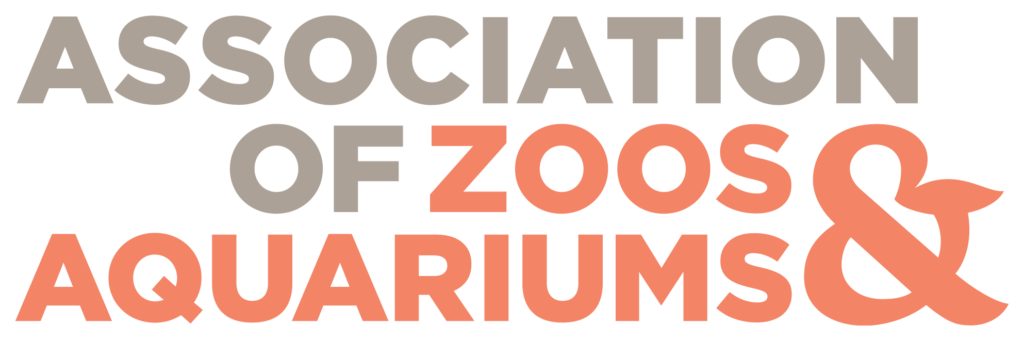
- Abbreviation: AZA
- Founded: October 1924; 102 years ago (as American Association of Zoological Parks and Aquariums)
- Type: Not-for-profit organization
- Tax ID no.: 55-0526930
- Legal status: 501(c)(3)
- Purpose: The advancement of zoological parks and aquariums in the areas of conservation, animal welfare, and conservation education.
- Headquarters: Silver Spring, Maryland, U.S.
- Coordinates: 38°59′41″N 77°01′53″W
- Region served: International
- Method: Accreditation
- Chair: Berto Castro
- President, Chief Executive Officer: Dan Ashe
- Executive Vice President: Craig Hoover
- Revenue: $12,786,124 (2016)
- Expenses: $10,427,633 (2016)
- Employees: 42 (2016)
- Volunteers: 350 (2016)
- Website: www.aza.org

The Association of Zoos and Aquariums (AZA), originally the American Association of Zoological Parks and Aquariums (AAZPA), is an American 501(c)(3) nonprofit organization founded in 1924 and dedicated to the advancement of zoos and public aquariums in the areas of conservation, education, science, and recreation. AZA is headquartered in Silver Spring, Maryland, and accredits zoos. There were 238 accredited zoos and aquariums as of 2025, primarily in the US, with a handful in twelve other countries; additionally, the AZA network contains 14 accredited related facilities.

== History ==
In October 1924 the American Association of Zoological Parks and Aquariums was formed as an affiliate of the American Institute of Park Executives. In 1966, the American Association of Zoological Parks and Aquariums became a professional branch affiliate of the newly formed National Recreation and Park Association, which absorbed the American Institute of Park Executives.

In the fall of 1971, the American Association of Zoological Parks and Aquariums membership voted to become an independent association. On January 19, 1972, it was chartered as the American Association of Zoological Parks and Aquariums with its executive office located in Wheeling, West Virginia, within the Oglebay Park Good Zoo. In 1994, the shorter name American Zoo and Aquarium Association (AZA) was adopted.

In early 2018, AZA acquired the Wildlife Trafficking Alliance to help grow public awareness about the purchase and sale of illegal wildlife products in the United States.

The Association of Zoos and Aquariums reported 195 million visitors to its 236 accredited member facilities in 2017.

== Activities ==
The organization is active in accreditation, animal care initiatives, education and conservation programs, collaborative research and advocacy.

AZA serves as an accrediting body for zoos and aquariums and ensures accredited facilities meet higher standards of animal care than required by law. Institutions are evaluated every five years in order to ensure standards are met and to maintain accreditation. As of March 2025, AZA had 238 accredited facilities in the US and other thirteen countries: Canada, Mexico, Bermuda, The Bahamas, the Dominican Republic, Colombia, Argentina, Spain, Hong Kong, Singapore, South Korea, and United Arab Emirates.

Approximately 800,000 animals representing 6,000 species are in the care of AZA-accredited facilities, including 1,000 threatened or endangered species. The association also facilitates both species survival plans and population management plans, which serve to sustainably manage genetically diverse captive populations of various animal species.

AZA holds a conference in September, one of the largest zoo and aquarium professionals' events in the US.

AZA also manages the citizen science program FrogWatch USA.

== Accreditation ==
In the United States, any public animal exhibit must be licensed and inspected by the United States Department of Agriculture, United States Environmental Protection Agency, Drug Enforcement Administration, Occupational Safety and Health Administration, and others. Depending on the animals they exhibit, the activities of zoos are regulated by laws including the Endangered Species Act, the Animal Welfare Act, the Migratory Bird Treaty Act of 1918 and others. Additionally, zoos in North America may choose to pursue accreditation by AZA.

The American association has developed a definition for zoological gardens and aquariums as part of its accreditation standards: "A permanent cultural institution which owns and maintains captive wild animals that represent more than a token collection and, under the direction of a professional staff, provides its collection with appropriate care and exhibits them in an aesthetic manner to the public on a regularly scheduled basis. They shall further be defined as having as their primary business the exhibition, conservation and preservation of the earth's fauna in an educational and scientific manner."

To achieve accreditation, a zoo must pass an application and inspection process and meet or exceed AZA's standards for animal health and welfare, fundraising, zoo staffing, and involvement in global conservation efforts. Inspection is performed by three experts (typically one veterinarian, one expert in animal care, and one expert in zoo management and operations) and then reviewed by a panel of twelve experts before accreditation is awarded. This accreditation process is repeated once every five years.

AZA estimates that there are approximately 2,800 animal exhibits operating under USDA license as of 2019; fewer than 10% are accredited. Certification is possible for facilities that hold animals, but are not regularly open to the public.

== Saving Animals From Extinction ==
AZA's Saving Animals From Extinction (SAFE) program prioritizes collaboration between zoos and aquariums to support highly vulnerable species. SAFE builds on existing recovery plans to implement strategic conservation and public engagement activities. In 2017, AZA member zoos and aquariums invested $15.6 million towards SAFE program species.

The SAFE program signature species include the African lion, African species of vultures, Asian elephant, Atlantic Acropora coral, black-footed ferret, black rhinoceros, cheetah, eastern indigo snake, giraffe, gorilla, sea turtles, orangutan, radiated tortoise, red wolf, sharks and sting rays, vaquita, western pond turtle, and whooping crane. There were more than 20 species or taxonomic groups included in the program as of 2019.

== Annual Report on Conservation and Science ==
The association has a computerized database called the Annual Report on Conservation and Science. This helps track AZA research projects worldwide.

AZA member zoos and aquariums contribute $220 million to conservation projects each year. They participate in 115 reintroduction programs, including more than 40 programs for species listed as threatened or endangered under the Endangered Species Act.

In 2017, member institutions reported participating in field conservation projects benefiting over 860 species in 128 countries. AZA zoos and aquariums spent $25 million on research and published 170 books, book chapters, journal articles, conference proceeding papers, posters and theses or dissertations. Animal care, health and welfare, followed by species and habitat conservation, describe 68% of the AZA community's research.

== List of member zoos and aquariums ==
To be a member, a facility must either be accredited or certified.

=== Accredited facilities ===
Accredited facilities maintain a professional staff and appropriate animal care, and are open to the public on a predictable basis. The following list is from 2025.

| Name | Address | City | State/country | Website |
|---|---|---|---|---|
| Abilene Zoological Gardens | 2070 Zoo Ln | Abilene | Texas, United States | Website |
| Adventure Aquarium | 1 Riverside Dr | Camden | New Jersey, United States | Website |
| Africam Safari | 11 Oriente #2407 | Puebla | Puebla, Mexico | Website |
| Akron Zoological Park | 500 Edgewood Ave | Akron | Ohio, United States | Website |
| Al Ain Zoo | Nahyan The First St - Shiab Al Ashkhar - Zoo | Abu Dhabi | United Arab Emirates | Website |
| Alaska SeaLife Center | 301 Railway Ave | Seward | Alaska, United States | Website |
| Albuquerque Biological Park | 903 10th St SW | Albuquerque | New Mexico, United States | Website |
| Aquarium of Niagara | 701 Whirlpool Street | Niagara Falls | New York, United States | Website |
| Aquarium of the Pacific | 100 Aquarium Way | Long Beach | California, United States | Website |
| Arizona-Sonora Desert Museum | 2021 N Kinney Rd | Tucson | Arizona, United States | Website |
| Assiniboine Park Zoo | 2595 Roblin Blvd | Winnipeg | Manitoba, Canada | Website |
| Atlantis The Palm, Dubai | Palm Jumeirah | Dubai | United Arab Emirates | Website |
| Atlantis Paradise Island | Paradise Island | Nassau | Bahamas | Website |
| Audubon Aquarium of the Americas | 1 Canal St | New Orleans | Louisiana, United States | Website |
| Audubon Zoo | 6500 Magazine St | New Orleans | Louisiana, United States | Website |
| Bailey-Matthews National Shell Museum | 3075 Sanibel-Captiva Road | Sanibel | Florida, United States | Website |
| Baylor University Bear Habitat | M P Daniel Esplanade | Waco | Texas, United States | Website |
| Bermuda Aquarium, Museum and Zoo | PO Box FL 145 | Flatts Village | Bermuda | Website |
| Binder Park Zoo | 7400 Division Dr | Battle Creek | Michigan, United States | Website |
| Biodôme de Montreal | 4777 Pierre-de-Coubertin | Montreal | Quebec, Canada | Website |
| Birch Aquarium | USCD, 9500 Gilman Dr | La Jolla | California, United States | Website |
| Birmingham Zoo | 1 Wild Pl | Birmingham | Alabama, United States | Website |
| Blank Park Zoo | 7401 SW 9th St | Des Moines | Iowa, United States | Website |
| Boonshoft Museum of Discovery | 2600 Deweese Parkway | Dayton | Ohio, United States | Website |
| Brandywine Zoo | 1001 N Park Dr | Wilmington | Delaware, United States | Website |
| BREC's Baton Rouge Zoo | 3601 Thomas Rd | Baker | Louisiana, United States | Website |
| Brevard Zoo | 8225 N Wickham Rd | Melbourne | Florida, United States | Website |
| Bronx Zoo | 2300 Southern Blvd | Bronx | New York, United States | Website |
| Brookgreen Gardens | PO Box 3368 | Pawleys Island | South Carolina, United States | Website |
| Buffalo Zoo | 300 Parkside Ave | Buffalo | New York, United States | Website |
| Busch Gardens (Tampa) | 10165 N McKinley Dr | Tampa | Florida, United States | Website |
| The Butterfly House | 15193 Olive Boulevard | Chesterfield | Missouri, United States | Website |
| Butterfly Pavilion | 6252 W 104th Ave | Westminster | Colorado, United States | Website |
| Buttonwood Park Zoo | 425 Hawthorn St | New Bedford | Massachusetts, United States | Website |
| Cabrillo Marine Aquarium | 3720 Stephen M. White Dr | San Pedro | California, United States | Website |
| Caldwell Zoo | 2203 W Martin Luther King Jr Blvd | Tyler | Texas, United States | Website |
| California Science Center | 700 State Drive | Los Angeles | California, United States | Website |
| Cameron Park Zoo | 1701 N 4th St | Waco | Texas, United States | Website |
| Cape May County Park Zoo | 4 Moore Rd Dn 801 | Cape May County Court House | New Jersey, United States | Website |
| Capron Park Zoo | 201 County St | Attleboro | Massachusetts, United States | Website |
| Central Florida Zoological Park | 3755 NW Hwy 17-92 | Sanford | Florida, United States | Website |
| Central Park Zoo | 830 5th Ave | New York City | New York, United States | Website |
| Central Coast Zoo | 9305 Pismo Ave | Atascadero | California, United States | Website |
| Chattanooga Zoo at Warner Park | 1101 McCallie Ave | Chattanooga | Tennessee, United States | Website |
| Cheyenne Mountain Zoological Park | 4250 Cheyenne Mount Zoo Rd | Colorado Springs | Colorado, United States | Website |
| Chicago Zoological Society - Brookfield Zoo | 3300 Golf Road | Brookfield | Illinois, United States | Website |
| Cincinnati Zoo and Botanical Garden | 3400 Vine Street | Cincinnati | Ohio, United States | Website |
| Cleveland Metroparks Zoo | 3900 Wildlife Way | Cleveland | Ohio, United States | Website |
| Clyde Peeling's Reptiland | 18628 US Route 15 | Allenwood | Pennsylvania, United States | Website |
| Columbus Zoo and Aquarium | 2661 Billingsley Rd | Powell | Ohio, United States | Website |
| Como Park Zoo and Conservatory | 1225 Estabrook Drive | Saint Paul | Minnesota, United States | Website |
| Connecticut's Beardsley Zoo | 1875 Noble Avenue | Bridgeport | Connecticut, United States | Website |
| Cosley Zoo | 1356 Gary Avenue | Wheaton | Illinois, United States | Website |
| CuriOdyssey | 1651 Coyote Point Drive | San Mateo | California, United States | Website |
| Dakota Zoo | 602 Riverside Park Rd, | Bismarck | North Dakota, United States | Website |
| Dallas World Aquarium | 1801 N Griffin Street | Dallas | Texas, United States | Website |
| Dallas Zoo | 650 So. R.L. Thorton Fwy | Dallas | Texas, United States | Website |
| David Traylor Zoo of Emporia | 75 Sodens Rd | Emporia | Kansas, United States | Website |
| Denver Zoo | 2300 Steele Street | Denver | Colorado, United States | Website |
| Detroit Zoo | 8450 W 10 Mile Rd | Royal Oak | Michigan, United States | Website |
| Dickerson Park Zoo | 3043 North Fort | Springfield | Missouri, United States | Website |
| Discovery Cove | 6000 Discovery Cove Way | Orlando | Florida, United States | Website |
| Disney's Animal Kingdom | PO Box 10000 | Bay Lake | Florida, United States | Website |
| Dolphin Discovery Cozumel | Carretera Costera Sur Km. 9.5 | Cozumel | Mexico | Website |
| Dolphin Discovery Isla Mujeres | Camino Sac Bajo Lote 26 | Isla Mujeres | Mexico | Website |
| Dolphin Discovery Punta Cana | Carretera De Veron Bavaro | Higuey Town, La Altagracia Province | Dominican Republic | Website |
| Dolphin Island | | Sentosa | Singapore | Website |
| El Paso Zoo | 4001 E Paisano Drive | El Paso | Texas, United States | Website |
| Elmwood Park Zoo | 1661 Harding Blvd | Norristown | Pennsylvania, United States | Website |
| Emirates Park Zoo | 12th St - Al Bahyah | Abu Dhabi | United Arab Emirates | Website |
| Everland Zoo | | Yongin, Gyeonggi-do | South Korea | Website |
| Florida Aquarium | 701 Channelside Drive | Tampa | Florida, United States | Website |
| Fort Wayne Children's Zoo | 3411 Sherman Blvd | Fort Wayne | Indiana, United States | Website |
| Fort Worth Zoo | 1989 Colonial Parkway | Fort Worth | Texas, United States | Website |
| Fossil Rim Wildlife Center | 2299 Co Rd 2008 | Glen Rose | Texas, United States | Website |
| Franklin Park Zoo | 1 Franklin Park Road | Boston | Massachusetts, United States | Website |
| Fresno Chaffee Zoo | 894 W Belmont Ave | Fresno | California, United States | Website |
| Fundación Temaikèn | Ruta 25, Km 1 | Belén de Escobar | Buenos Aires Province, Argentina | Website |
| Georgia Aquarium | 225 Baker Street | Atlanta | Georgia, United States | Website |
| Gladys Porter Zoo | 500 Ringgold Street | Brownsville | Texas, United States | Website |
| Great Plains Zoo and Museum | 805 S Kiwanis Avenue | Sioux Falls | South Dakota, United States | Website |
| Greensboro Science Center | 4301 Lawndale Dr. | Greensboro | North Carolina, United States | Website |
| Greenville Zoo | 150 Cleveland Park Drive | Greenville | South Carolina, United States | Website |
| Grizzly & Wolf Discovery Center | 201 South Canyon | West Yellowstone | Montana, United States | Website |
| Happy Hollow Park & Zoo | 1300 Senter Road | San Jose | California, United States | Website |
| Hattiesburg Zoo | 107 S 17th Ave | Hattiesburg | Mississippi, United States | Website |
| Henry Vilas Zoo | 702 S Randall Avenue | Madison | Wisconsin, United States | Website |
| High Desert Museum | 59800 S Hwy 97 | Bend | Oregon, United States | Website |
| Honolulu Zoo | 151 Kapahulu Ave | Honolulu | Hawaii, United States | Website |
| Houston Zoo | 1513 N Macgregor Drive | Houston | Texas, United States | Website |
| Hutchinson Zoo | 6 Emerson Loop | Hutchinson | Kansas, United States | Website |
| Idaho Falls Zoo at Tautphaus Park | 2725 Carnival Way | Idaho Falls | Idaho, United States | Website |
| International Crane Foundation | E11376 Shady Lane Rd | Baraboo | Wisconsin, United States | Website |
| Jacksonville Zoo and Gardens | 370 Zoo Parkway | Jacksonville | Florida, United States | Website |
| Jenkinson's Aquarium | 300 Ocean Avenue | Point Pleasant Beach | New Jersey, United States | Website |
| John Ball Zoological Garden | 1300 W Fulton Street | Grand Rapids | Michigan, United States | Website |
| John G. Shedd Aquarium | 1200 S Lake Shore Drive | Chicago | Illinois, United States | Website |
| Kansas City Zoo in Swope Park | 6800 Zoo Drive | Kansas City | Missouri, United States | Website |
| Lake Superior Zoo | 7210 Fremont Street | Duluth | Minnesota, United States | Website |
| Landry's Downtown Aquarium | 700 Water Street | Denver | Colorado, United States | Website |
| Landry's Houston Aquarium | 410 Bagby Street | Houston | Texas, United States | Website |
| Lee G. Simmons Conservation Park and Wildlife Safari | 16406 292 Street | Ashland | Nebraska, United States | Website |
| Lee Richardson Zoo | 312 Finnup Drive | Garden City | Kansas, United States | Website |
| Lehigh Valley Zoo | 5150 Game Preserve Rd. | Schnecksville | Pennsylvania, United States | Website |
| Lincoln Children's Zoo | 1222 S 27th Street | Lincoln | Nebraska, United States | Website |
| Lincoln Park Zoo | 2001 N Clark Street | Chicago | Illinois, United States | Website |
| Lion Country Safari | 2003 Lion Country Safari Road | Loxahatchee | Florida, United States | Website |
| Little Rock Zoological Gardens | 1 Zoo Drive | Little Rock | Arkansas, United States | Website |
| Living Desert Zoo and Gardens | 47900 Portola Avenue | Palm Desert | California, United States | Website |
| Longneck Manor | 1749 Beyer Rd | Fredericksburg | Texas, United States | Website |
| Los Angeles Zoo | 5333 Zoo Drive | Los Angeles | California, United States | Website |
| Louisville Zoological Garden | 1100 Trevilian Way | Louisville | Kentucky, United States | Website |
| Loveland Living Planet Aquarium | 12033 Lone Peak Pkwy | Draper | Utah, United States | Website |
| Marineland of Florida | 9600 N Ocean Shore Blvd | St. Augustine | Florida, United States | Website |
| Maritime Aquarium at Norwalk | 10 North Water St | Norwalk | Connecticut, United States | Website |
| Maryland Zoo in Baltimore (formerly the Baltimore City Zoo) | 1876 Mansion House Drive, Druid Hill Park, | Baltimore | Maryland, United States | Website |
| Memphis Zoo | 2000 Prentiss Place | Memphis | Tennessee, United States | Website |
| Mesker Park Zoo and Botanic Garden | 2421 Bement Avenue | Evansville | Indiana, United States | Website |
| Miller Park Zoo | 1020 S Morris Avenue | Bloomington | Illinois, United States | Website |
| Milwaukee County Zoo | 10001 W Bluemound Road | Milwaukee | Wisconsin, United States | Website |
| Minnesota Zoo | 13000 Zoo Blvd | Apple Valley | Minnesota, United States | Website |
| Monterey Bay Aquarium | 886 Cannery Row | Monterey | California, United States | Website |
| Moody Gardens Rainforest and Aquarium | 1 Hope Blvd | Galveston | Texas, United States | Website |
| Mote Marine Aquarium | 1600 Ken Thompson Parkway | Sarasota | Florida, United States | Website |
| Museum of Life and Science | 433 W Murray Ave | Durham | North Carolina, United States | Website |
| Museum of Science | Science Park | Boston | Massachusetts, United States | Website |
| Mystic Aquarium & Institute for Exploration | 55 Coogan Blvd | Mystic | Connecticut, United States | Website |
| Naples Zoo at Caribbean Gardens | 1590 Goodlette-Frank Rd | Naples | Florida, United States | Website |
| Nashville Zoo | 3777 Nolensville Road | Nashville | Tennessee, United States | Website |
| National Aquarium in Baltimore (formerly the Baltimore Aquarium) | 501 East Pratt Street Pier 3, Inner Harbor | Baltimore | Maryland, United States | Website |
| National Aviary | Allegheny Commons West | Pittsburgh | Pennsylvania, United States | Website |
| National Mississippi River Museum & Aquarium | 350 East Third Street | Port of Dubuque | Iowa, United States | Website |
| New England Aquarium | Central Wharf | Boston | Massachusetts, United States | Website |
| New York Aquarium | Surf Avenue at West 8th Street | Brooklyn | New York, United States | Website |
| Newport Aquarium | One Aquarium Way | Newport | Kentucky, United States | Website |
| North Carolina Aquarium at Fort Fisher | 900 Loggerhead Road | Kure Beach | North Carolina, United States | Website |
| North Carolina Aquarium at Pine Knoll Shores | 1 Roosevelt Blvd | Atlantic Beach | North Carolina, United States | Website |
| North Carolina Aquarium on Roanoke Island | 374 Airport Rd | Manteo | North Carolina, United States | Website |
| North Carolina Zoological Park | 4401 Zoo Pkwy | Asheboro | North Carolina, United States | Website |
| Northeastern Wisconsin (NEW) Zoo | 4418 Reforestation Road | Green Bay | Wisconsin, United States | Website |
| Northwest Trek Wildlife Park | 11610 Trek Drive E | Eatonville | Washington, United States | Website |
| Oakland Zoo | 9777 Golf Links Rd | Oakland | California, United States | Website |
| L'Oceanogràfic | Carrer d'Eduardo Primo Yúfera, 1B | Valencia | Spain | Website |
| Ocean Park, Hong Kong | Ocean Park Road | Wong Chuk Hang | Hong Kong | Website |
| OdySea Aquarium | 9500 East Vía de Ventura A-100 | Scottsdale | Arizona, United States | Website |
| Oglebay's Good Zoo | Rt. 88 N | Wheeling | West Virginia, United States | Website |
| Oklahoma City Zoological Park | 2101 NE 50th St | Oklahoma City | Oklahoma, United States | Website |
| Omaha's Henry Doorly Zoo | 3701 S 10th St | Omaha | Nebraska, United States | Website |
| Oregon Coast Aquarium | 2820 SE Ferry Slip Road | Newport | Oregon, United States | Website |
| Oregon Zoo | 4001 SW Canyon Road | Portland | Oregon, United States | Website |
| Palm Beach Zoo | 1301 Summit Blvd | West Palm Beach | Florida, United States | Website |
| Palo Alto Junior Museum and Zoo | 1451 Middlefield Rd | Palo Alto | California, United States | Website |
| Parc Omega | 399 Route 323 Nord | Montebello | Quebec, Canada | Website |
| Peoria Zoo | 2218 N. Prospect Rd. | Peoria | Illinois, United States | Website |
| Philadelphia Zoo | 3400 W Girard Avenue | Philadelphia | Pennsylvania, United States | Website |
| Phoenix Zoo | 455 N Galvin Pkwy | Phoenix | Arizona, United States | Website |
| Pittsburgh Zoo & PPG Aquarium | 7340 Butler St | Pittsburgh | Pennsylvania, United States | Website |
| Point Defiance Zoo & Aquarium | 5400 N Pearl St | Tacoma | Washington, United States | Website |
| Potawatomi Zoo | 500 S Greenlawn Avenue | South Bend | Indiana, United States | Website |
| Potter Park Zoo | 1301 S Pennsylvania Avenue | Lansing | Michigan, United States | Website |
| Prospect Park Zoo | 450 Flatbush Avenue | Brooklyn | New York, United States | Website |
| Pueblo Zoo | 3455 Nuckolls Avenue | Pueblo | Colorado, United States | Website |
| Queens Zoo | 5351 111th St | Flushing | New York, United States | Website |
| Racine Zoo | 2131 North Main Street | Racine | Wisconsin, United States | Website |
| Red River Zoo | 4220 21st Ave SW | Fargo | North Dakota, United States | Website |
| Reid Park Zoo | 1100 S Randolph Way | Tucson | Arizona, United States | Website |
| Ripley's Aquarium at Myrtle Beach | 1110 Celebrity Circle | Myrtle Beach | South Carolina, United States | Website |
| Ripley's Aquarium of Canada | 288 Bremner Blvd | Toronto | Ontario, Canada | Website |
| Ripley's Aquarium of the Smokies | 88 River Road | Gatlinburg | Tennessee, United States | Website |
| Riverbanks Zoological Park | 500 Wildlife Pkwy | Columbia | South Carolina, United States | Website |
| Roger Williams Park Zoo | 1000 Elmwood Avenue | Providence | Rhode Island, United States | Website |
| Rolling Hills Zoo | 625 N Hedville Road | Salina | Kansas, United States | Website |
| Roosevelt Park Zoo | 1219 E Burdick Expy | Minot | North Dakota, United States | Website |
| Rosamond Gifford Zoo | One Conservation Place | Syracuse | New York, United States | Website |
| Sacramento Zoo | 3930 W Land Park Drive | Sacramento | California, United States | Website |
| Saginaw Children's Zoo | 1730 South Washington Avenue | Saginaw | Michigan, United States | Website |
| Saint Louis Zoo | 1 Government Drive | Saint Louis | Missouri, United States | Website |
| San Antonio Zoological Gardens & Aquarium | 3903 N. Saint Mary's Street | San Antonio | Texas, United States | Website |
| San Diego Zoo | 2920 Zoo Dr | San Diego | California, United States | Website |
| San Diego Zoo Safari Park | 15500 San Pasqual Valley Road | Escondido | California, United States | Website |
| San Francisco Zoological Gardens | 1 Zoo Road | San Francisco | California, United States | Website |
| Santa Ana Zoo | 1801 E Chestnut Ave | Santa Ana | California, United States | Website |
| Santa Barbara Zoo | 500 Ninos Drive | Santa Barbara | California, United States | Website |
| Santa Fe College Teaching Zoo | 3000 NW 83rd St | Gainesville | Florida, United States | Website |
| Scovill Zoo | 71 S Country Club Road | Decatur | Illinois, United States | Website |
| S.E.A. Aquarium | | Sentosa | Singapore | Website |
| Sea Life Arizona | 5000 S Arizona Mills Cir #145 | Tempe | Arizona, United States | Website |
| SEA LIFE Carlsbad Aquarium | 1 Legoland Dr, Carlsbad, CA 92008 | Carlsbad | California, United States | Website |
| Sea Life Charlotte-Concord | 8111 Concord Mills Boulevard | Concord | North Carolina, United States | Website |
| Sea Life Grapevine | 3000 Grapevine Mills Pkwy | Grapevine | Texas, United States | Website |
| Sea Life Kansas City | 2475 Grand Blvd | Kansas City | Missouri, United States | Website |
| Sea Life Michigan | 4316 Baldwin Road | Auburn Hills | Michigan, United States | Website |
| Sea Life Orlando Aquarium | 8449 International Dr | Orlando | Florida, United States | Website |
| The Seas with Nemo & Friends | PO Box 10000 | Bay Lake | Florida, United States | Website |
| Seattle Aquarium | 1483 Alaskan Way Pier 59 | Seattle | Washington, United States | Website |
| SeaWorld Abu Dhabi | Yas Island | Abu Dhabi | United Arab Emirates | Website |
| SeaWorld Orlando | 7007 SeaWorld Drive | Orlando | Florida, United States | Website |
| SeaWorld San Antonio | 10500 SeaWorld Drive | San Antonio | Texas, United States | Website |
| SeaWorld San Diego | 500 SeaWorld Drive | San Diego | California, United States | Website |
| Sedgwick County Zoo | 5555 W Zoo Blvd | Wichita | Kansas, United States | Website |
| Seneca Park Zoo | 2222 Saint Paul St. | Rochester | New York, United States | Website |
| Seoul Grand Park | | Seoul | South Korea | Website |
| Sequoia Park Zoo | 3414 W St | Eureka | California, United States | Website |
| Shark Reef at Mandalay Bay | 3950 Las Vegas Blvd. South | Las Vegas | Nevada, United States | Website |
| Smithsonian National Zoological Park | 3001 Connecticut Avenue NW | Washington | District of Columbia, United States | Website |
| South Carolina Aquarium | 100 Aquarium Wharf | Charleston | South Carolina, United States | Website |
| St. Augustine Alligator Farm | 999 Anastasia Boulevard | St. Augustine | Florida, United States | Website |
| Staten Island Zoo | 614 Broadway | Staten Island | New York, United States | Website |
| Steinhart Aquarium | 55 Music Concourse Drive | San Francisco | California, United States | Website |
| Stone Zoo | 149 Pond St | Stoneham | Massachusetts, United States | Website |
| Sunset Zoological Park | 2333 Oak Drive | Manhattan | Kansas, United States | Website |
| Tennessee Aquarium | 1 Broad St | Chattanooga | Tennessee, United States | Website |
| Texas State Aquarium | 2710 N Shoreline Blvd | Corpus Christi | Texas, United States | Website |
| Toledo Zoological Gardens | 2700 Broadway St | Toledo | Ohio, United States | Website |
| Topeka Zoo | 635 SW Gage Blvd | Topeka | Kansas, United States | Website |
| Toronto Zoo | 2000 Meadowvale Rd | Toronto | Ontario, Canada | Website |
| Tracy Aviary | 589 E 1300 S | Salt Lake City | Utah, United States | Website |
| Trevor Zoo | Millbrook School Road | Millbrook | New York, United States | Website |
| Tulsa Zoo | 6421 E 36th St N | Tulsa | Oklahoma, United States | Website |
| Turtle Back Zoo | 560 Northfield Avenue | West Orange | New Jersey, United States | Website |
| Utah's Hogle Zoo | 2600 Sunnyside Avenue | Salt Lake City | Utah, United States | Website |
| Utica Zoo | 1 Utica Zoo Way | Utica | New York, United States | Website |
| Vancouver Aquarium Marine Science Centre | 845 Avison Way | Vancouver | British Columbia, Canada | Website |
| Virginia Aquarium and Marine Science Center | 717 General Booth Blvd | Virginia Beach | Virginia, United States | Website |
| Virginia Living Museum | 524 J Clyde Morris Boulevard | Newport News | Virginia, United States | Website |
| Virginia Zoological Park | 3500 Granby Street | Norfolk | Virginia, United States | Website |
| Western North Carolina Nature Center | 75 Gashes Creek Road | Asheville | North Carolina, United States | Website |
| Wildlife Safari | 1790 Safari Rd | Winston | Oregon, United States | Website |
| The Wilds | 14000 International Road | Cumberland | Ohio, United States | Website |
| Wilder Institute/Calgary Zoo | 1300 Zoo Road NE | Calgary | Alberta, Canada | Website |
| Wonders of Wildlife Museum & Aquarium | 500 W Sunshine St | Springfield | Missouri, United States | Website |
| Woodland Park Zoo | 601 N 59th St | Seattle | Washington, United States | Website |
| Zoo Atlanta | 800 Cherokee Avenue SE | Atlanta | Georgia, United States | Website |
| Zoo Boise | 355 Julia Davis Drive | Boise | Idaho, United States | Website |
| Zoo de Granby | 525 rue St-Hubert | Granby | Quebec, Canada | Website |
| Zoo Knoxville | 3500 Knoxville Zoo Dr | Knoxville | Tennessee, United States | Website |
| Zoo Miami | 12400 SW 152nd St / One Zoo Boulevard | Miami | Florida, United States | Website |
| ZooAmerica | 100 W Hersheypark Drive | Hershey | Pennsylvania, United States | Website |
| Zoológico de Cali | Carrera 2 oeste, calle 14 esquina | Cali | Colombia | Website |
| Zoológico Guadalajara | C. P.º del Zoológico 600, Huentitán El Alto, 44390 | Guadalajara | Jalisco, Mexico | Website |
| ZooMontana | 2100 S Shiloh Rd | Billings | Montana, United States | Website |
| ZooTampa at Lowry Park | 1101 W. Sligh Avenue | Tampa | Florida, United States | Website |

=== Certified related facilities ===
Certified facilities maintain a professional staff and appropriate animal care, but are not open to the public on a predictable basis.

| Name | Address | City | State/country | Website |
|---|---|---|---|---|
| Ape Cognition and Conservation Initiative | - | Des Moines | Iowa | Website |
| Audubon Nature Institute Center for Research of Endangered Species | 6500 Magazine Street | New Orleans | Louisiana | Website |
| B. Bryan Preserve | 130 Riverside Drive | Point Arena | California | Website |
| Colorado Wolf & Wildlife Center | 4729 Twin Rocks Road | Divide | Colorado | Website |
| Duke Lemur Center | 3705 Erwin Rd | Durham | North Carolina | Website |
| The Elephant Sanctuary (Hohenwald) | 27 E Main St | Hohenwald | Tennessee | Website |
| Endangered Wolf Center | 6750 Tyson Valley Road | Eureka | Missouri | Website |
| Lemur Conservation Foundation | - | Myakka City | Florida | Website |
| Lubee Bat Conservancy | 1309 NW 192nd Ave | Gainesville | Florida | Website |
| Natural Encounters, Inc. | 127 Conservation Way | Winter Haven | Florida | Website |
| Pinola Conservancy | - | - | Louisiana | Website |
| Turtle Conservancy | - | Ojai | California | Website |
| Turtle Survival Center | - | Charleston | South Carolina | Website |
| White Oak Conservation | 581705 White Oak Road | Yulee | Florida | Website |
| Wilderness Wildlife Center | - | - | Pennsylvania | Website |

=== Former members ===
| Name | Address | City | State/country | Website |
|---|---|---|---|---|
| Acuario de Veracruz | Blvd. Manuel Ávila Camacho S/N, Ricardo Flores Magón | Veracruz | Veracruz, Mexico | Website |
| African Safari Wildlife Park | 267 S Lightner Road | Port Clinton | Ohio, United States | Website |
| Alameda Park Zoo | 1321 N White Sands Blvd | Alamogordo | New Mexico, United States | Website |
| Alexandria Zoological Park | 3016 Masonic Dr | Alexandria | Louisiana, United States | Website |
| Aquarium of the Bay | The Embarcadero at Beach St Pier 39 | San Francisco | California, United States | Website |
| Bergen County Zoological Park | 216 Forest Ave | Paramus | New Jersey, United States | Website |
| Binghamton Zoo at Ross Park | 60 Morgan Rd | Binghamton | New York, United States | Website |
| Bramble Park Zoo | 800 10th St NW | Watertown | South Dakota, United States | Website |
| Chehaw Park | 105 Chehaw Park Rd | Albany | Georgia, United States | Website |
| Erie Zoo | 423 W 38th St | Erie | Pennsylvania, United States | Website |
| Henson Robinson Zoo | 1100 E Lake Drive | Springfield | Illinois, United States | Website |
| Indianapolis Zoo | 1200 W Washington St | Indianapolis | Indiana, United States | Website |
| Jackson Zoo | 2918 W Capitol St | Jackson | Mississippi, United States | Website |
| Living Desert Zoo and Gardens State Park | 1504 Miehls Rd | Carlsbad | New Mexico, United States | Website |
| Mill Mountain Zoo | Mill Mountain Spur | Roanoke | Virginia, United States | Website |
| Montgomery Zoo | 2301 Coliseum Pkwy | Montgomery | Alabama, United States | Website |
| Niabi Zoo | 13010 Niabi Zoo Rd | Coal Valley | Illinois, United States | Website |
| Parque Zoologico de León | Carretera an Ibarrilla Km. 6, Col. Ibarrilla | León | Guanajuato, Mexico | Website |
| Safari West | 3115 Porter Creek Road | Sonoma County | California, United States | Website |
| Salisbury Zoo | 755 S Park Dr | Salisbury | Maryland, United States | Website |
| Six Flags Discovery Kingdom | 1001 Fairgrounds Dr | Vallejo | California, United States | Website |
| Squam Lakes Natural Science Center | 23 Science Center Rd | Holderness | New Hampshire, United States | Website |
| The Texas Zoo | 110 Memorial Dr | Victoria | Texas, United States | Website |
| The Zoo Northwest Florida | 5701 Gulf Breeze Pkwy | Gulf Breeze | Florida, United States | Website |
| Wildlife World Zoo and Aquarium | 16501 W Northern Ave | Litchfield Park | Arizona, United States | Website |

== Notable people ==
- Melanie R. Bond, biologist, primate scientist and author

== See also ==
- List of zoo associations
- World Association of Zoos and Aquariums
