= CuriOdyssey =

Zoo and science museum in San Mateo, California

- Interactive map of CuriOdyssey
- 37.586554°N 122.317636°W
- Date opened: 1954
- Location: San Mateo, California
- Land area: 3 acres (1.2 ha)
- No. of animals: 100
- Annual visitors: 75,000
- Memberships: AZA
- Website: www.curiodyssey.org

CuriOdyssey is a science museum and zoo in San Mateo, California containing animals and interactive science exhibits. CuriOdyssey is home to nearly 100 rescued animals, most native to California, that cannot survive in the wild. CuriOdyssey's exhibits include a science playground where kids play with scientific phenomena.

CuriOdyssey is a member of the Association of Science-Technology Centers (ASTC) and the Association of Zoos and Aquariums (AZA). CuriOdyssey also participates in the Museums for All program, offering free admission and reduced-cost membership to qualifying families.

== History ==
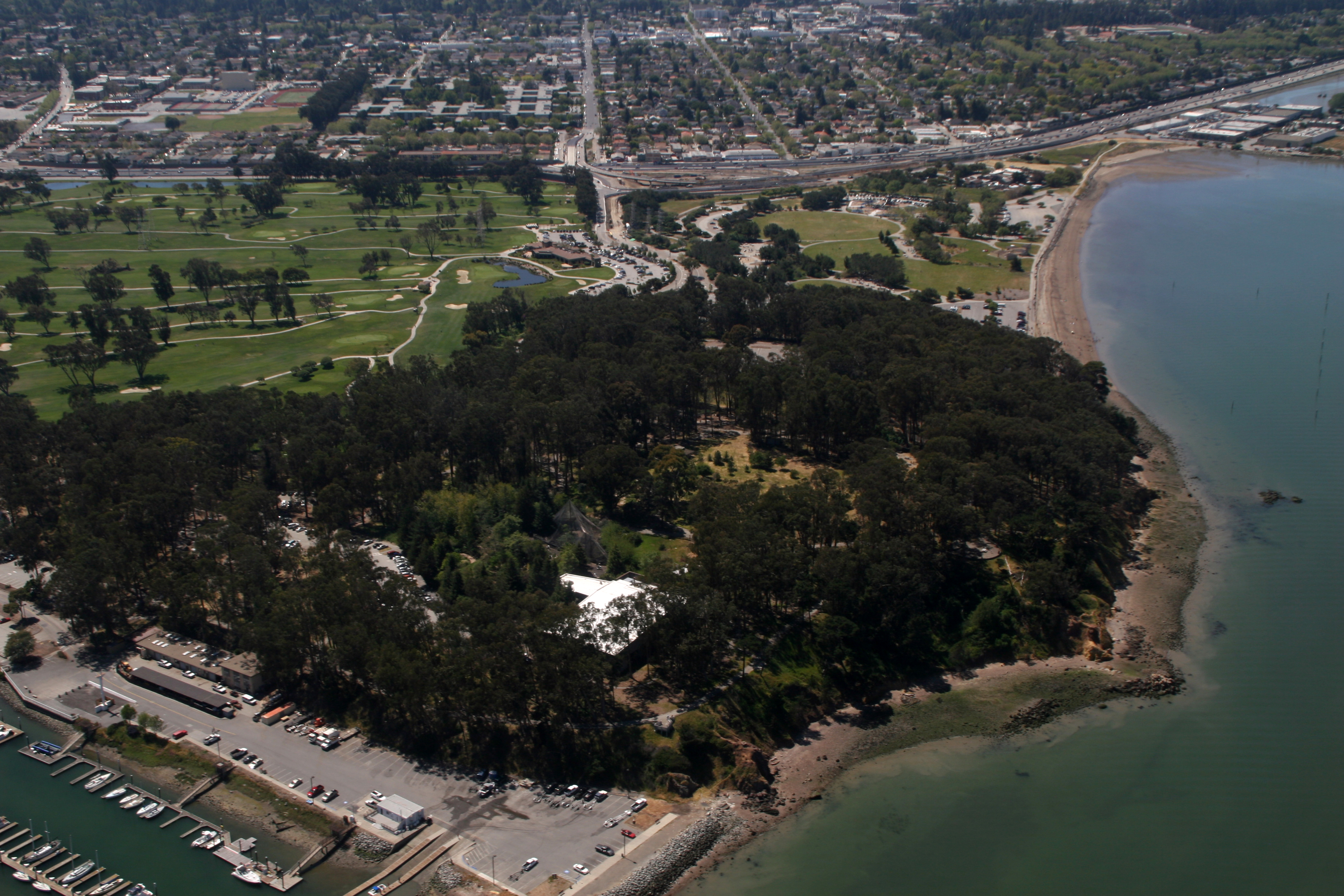
Aerial view.

CuriOdyssey was formerly Coyote Point Museum for Environmental Education, and Coyote Point Museum. Located at 1651 Coyote Point Drive in San Mateo, California, it is part of the Coyote Point Recreation Area, which overlooks the San Francisco Bay. The museum was founded in 1954 as the San Mateo County Junior Museum and was housed in a Quonset hut on the point.

It was renamed "Coyote Point Museum for Environmental Education" in 1974, and the main museum building opened in 1981. In 1991, the museum opened its wildlife exhibits to show live animals that represented the ecosystems of San Mateo County.

In July 2006, the museum made its $745,000 deficit public. In August, it announced the organization was considering two proposals to save the museum: one from "Campaign to Save Coyote Point Museum," and the other from the "11th Hour Project," which proposed to scrap the museum and build an education centre for global warming. In 30 days, the Campaign to Save Coyote Point Museum raised $540,247 in pledges from 776 donors, with an additional pledge from the TomKat Foundation of $500,000 over four years. In September 2006, they officially took over management of the museum.

Rachel Meyer, formerly executive director of the Palo Alto Junior Museum and Zoo and Chief Curator of Exhibits at the Exploratorium, was named the new executive director of CuriOdyssey (then Coyote Point Museum) on March 19, 2007. With Meyer's arrival, the organization re-oriented to focus on young children, offering them direct, life-charting experiences with science and nature.

On January 15, 2011, Coyote Point Museum officially unveiled its new name, CuriOdyssey. CuriOdyssey installed two public art installations in 2013. The first, designed by Eric Maschwitz and mounted on the exterior of the building, consists of more than 200 pinwheels, illustrating the wind currents at Coyote Point. The second, created by Mark Brest van Kempen, consists of more than 100 weather vanes.

== Exhibits ==
The museum delivers education programs, science exhibits, and wildlife viewing and interactions to give young visitors an introduction to the sciences and natural history of the San Francisco Bay Area.

- Science Exhibits – 50+ hands-on science exhibits designed specifically for young visitors invite children and families to explore and experiment with natural phenomena including gravity, light, perception, lift and more.

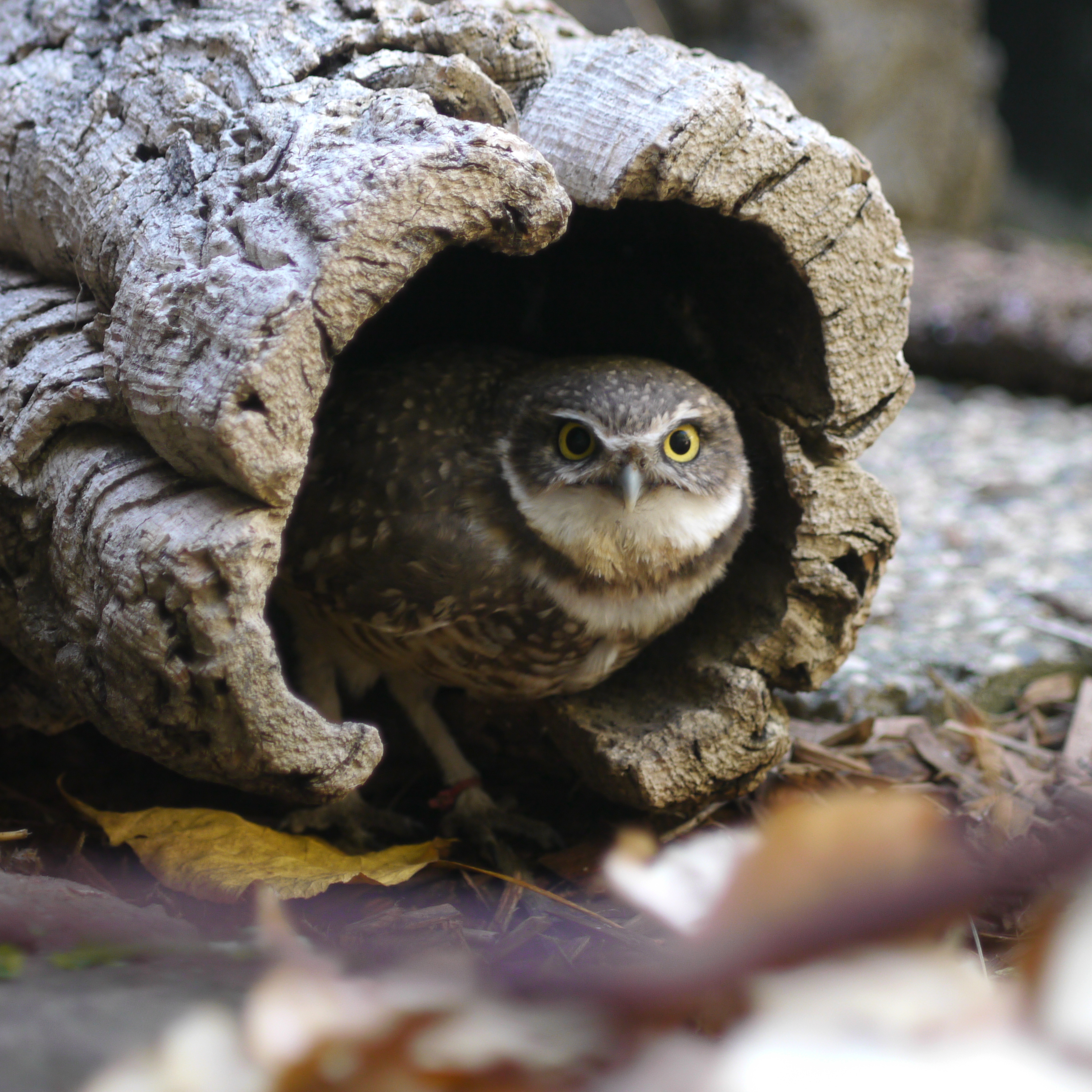
Burrowing owl (Athene cunicularia) in a natural habitat.

- Wildlife Habitats and Animal Ambassadors – 20 naturalistic habitats house nearly 100 non-releasable animals native to California, including a bobcat, a river otter, Virginia opossum, snakes, golden eagles, gray fox, turtles, owls, western toad, turkey vultures, raccoons and others. Visitors can wind through a tunnel that lets them see into dens and interior enclosures, and then walk back around the outside to see how the animals live in the wild. Weekend wildlife presentations introduce individuals to the 50 additional Animal Ambassadors that keepers present for young visitors to see and (sometimes) touch. These education animals include birds of prey, snakes, a blue-tongued skink and much else.
- Aviary – 4,000 ft^{2} (370 m^{2}) walk-through facility that houses over a dozen non-releasable, native California birds.
- Gardens – 1.3 acres (0.53 ha) of primarily native plants including a hummingbird garden and butterfly habitat.

== Education ==
The museum offers a range of hands-on programs designed for school and group educators in the sciences, as well as programs for the general public that help visitors explore, discover, and interact with nature and natural phenomena. The CuriOdyssey Mobile Museum and Animal Ambassadors regularly visit public parks as well as schools and other sites by special arrangement.

== Gallery ==
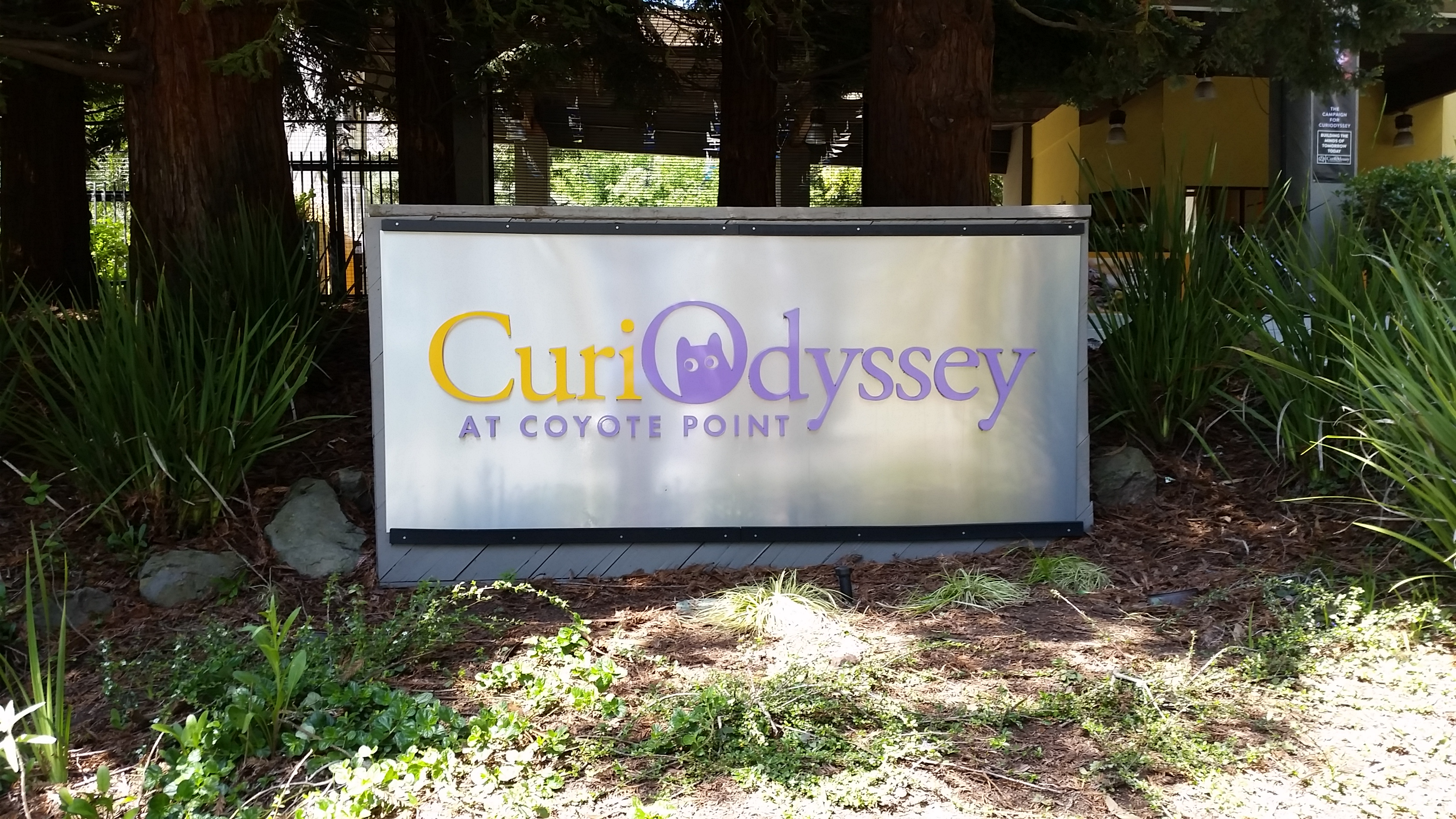
Entrance walkway.

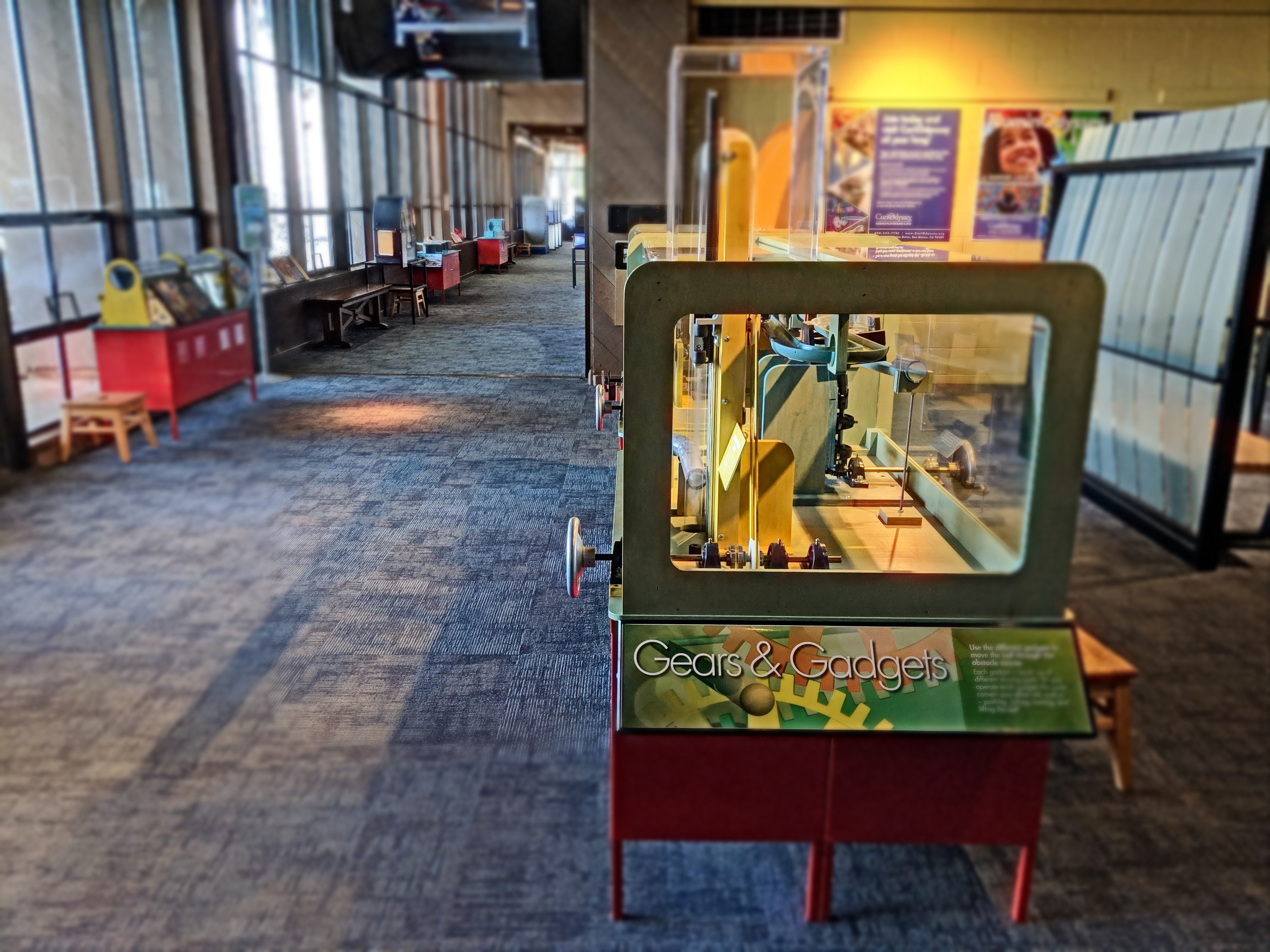
Indoor Science Exhibits.

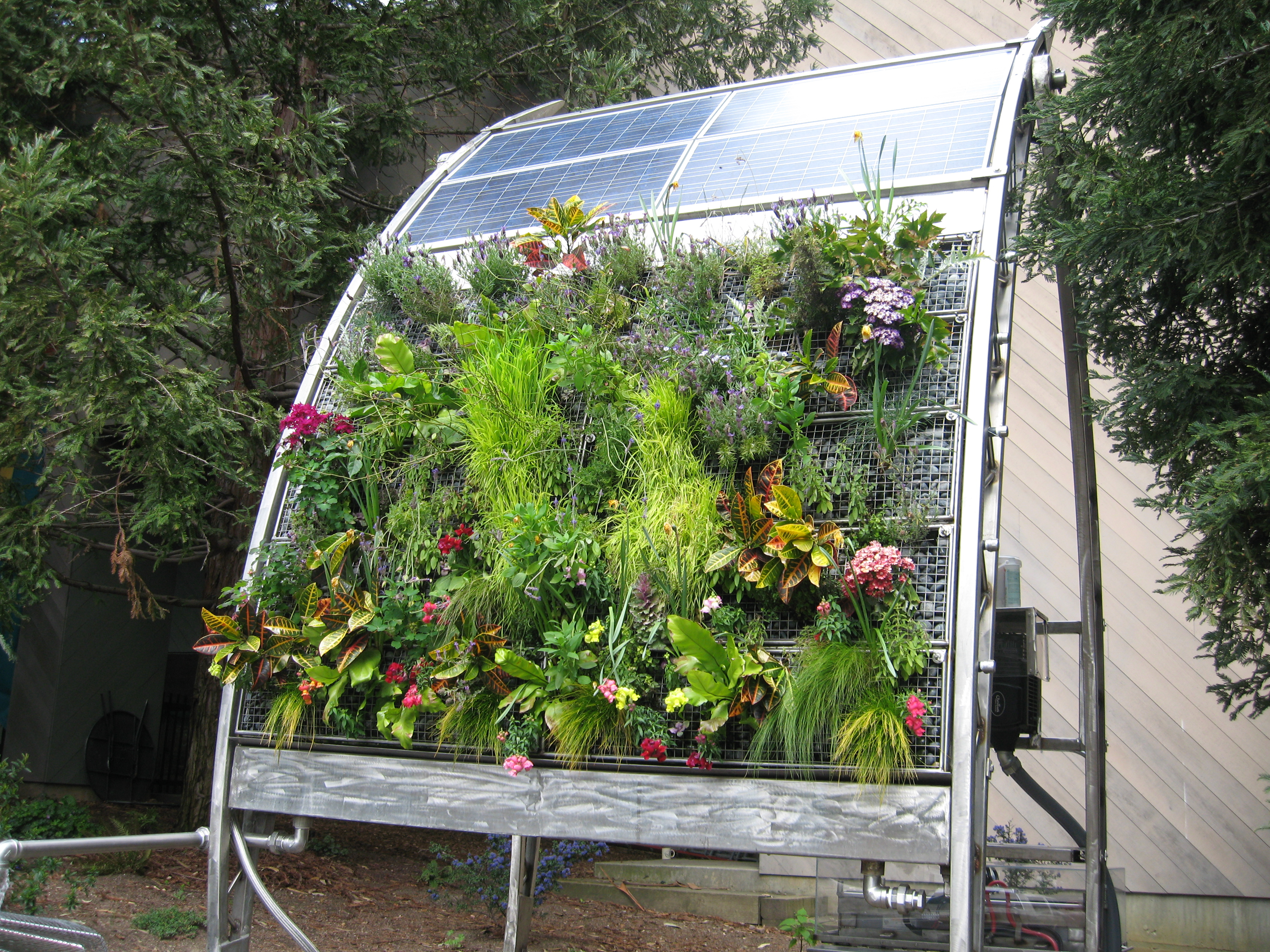
Hydroponic solar vertical garden on display.

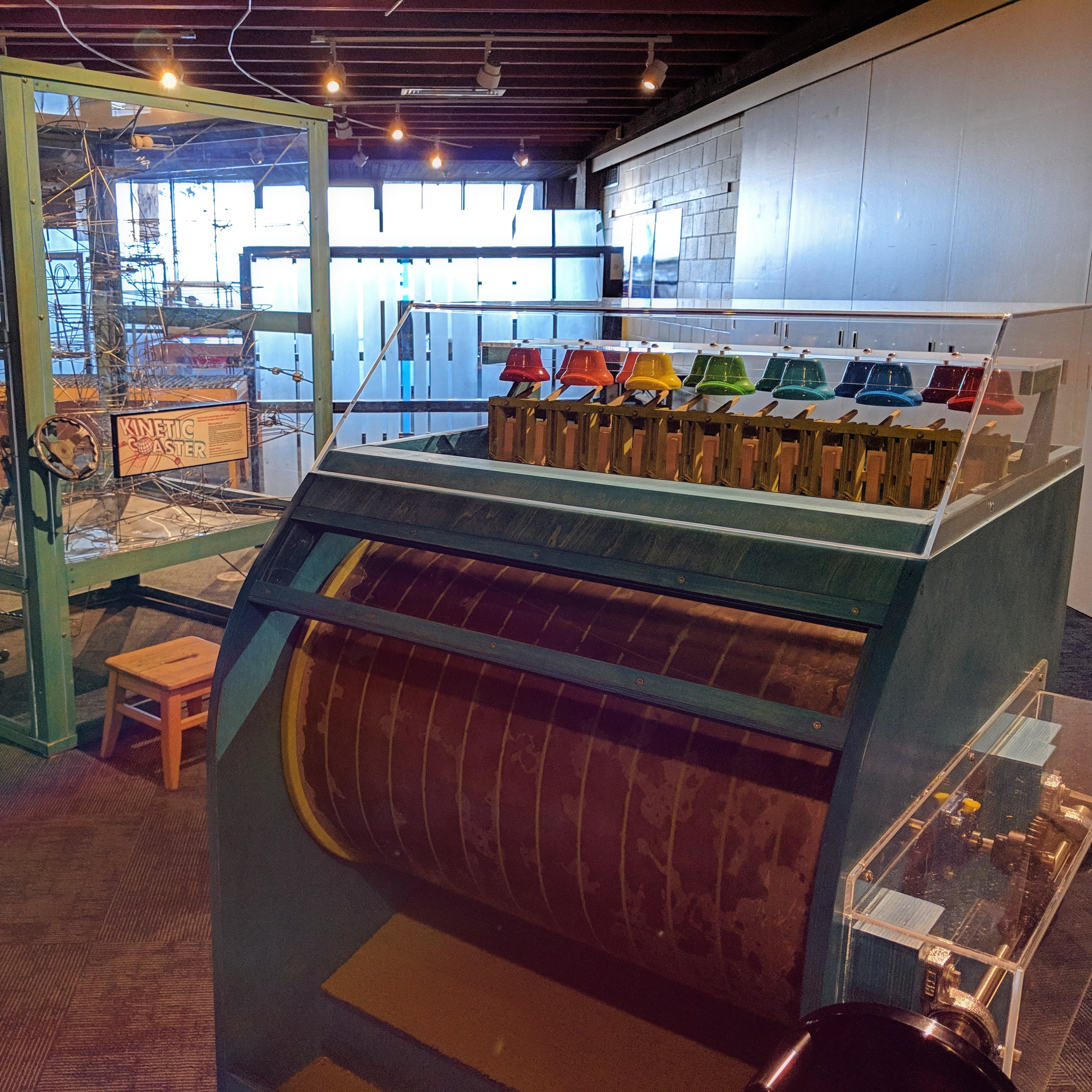
Colorful Science for Kids.

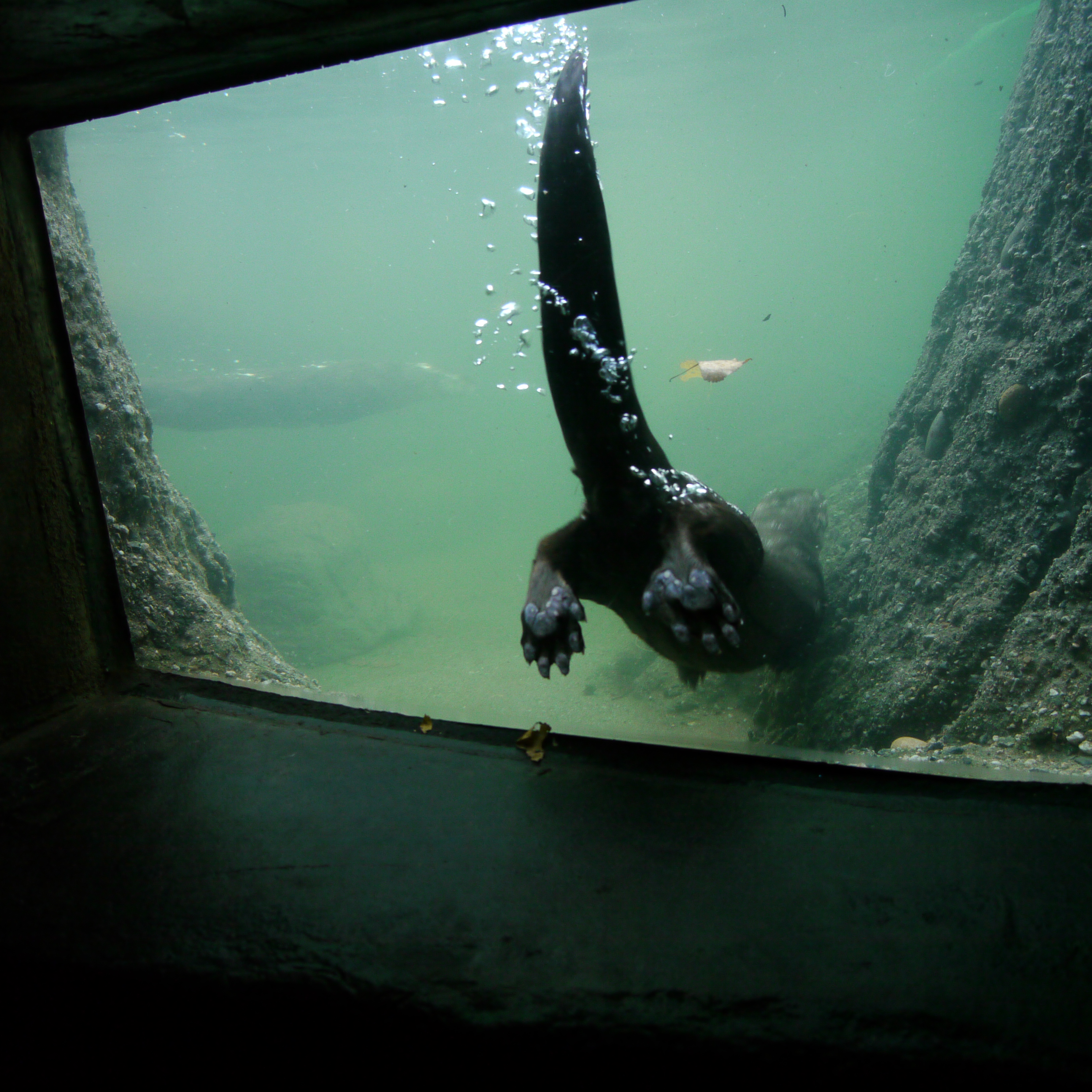
Otters swimming.
