= Tri-State Zoological Park =

- Interactive map of Tri-State Zoological Park
- 39.6636247°N 78.7148692°W
- Date opened: 2003
- Date closed: October 2, 2022
- Location: Cumberland, Maryland, United States
- Land area: 16 acres (6.5 ha)
- Website: http://www.tristatezoologicalpark.com

The Tri-State Zoological Park was a 16-acre (6.5 ha) zoo located in Cumberland, Maryland, United States. The nonprofit zoo opened in 2003, and contained mainly exotic animals rescued or in need of homes, including lions, tigers, primates, various exotics, birds and reptiles.

The zoo was privately owned by Bob Candy of Cumberland and has no paid employees, run only by volunteers.

In February, 2020, four years after beginning a legal battle, PETA forcibly removed three big cats from Tri-State Zoological Park to a facility in Colorado.

The zoo was not accredited by the Association of Zoos and Aquariums. >

On October 2, 2022, the zoo permanently closed its doors.

== March 2006 fire ==
On the morning of March 29, 2006, the main building was destroyed by fire, with the loss of approximately 100 animals. The only animals inside the building that survived were two alligators. All of the animals housed away from the main building were not harmed. The cause of the fire was ruled accidental due to older electrical wiring beneath the building, and the zoo and animal rescue has remained open.

== 2019 legal action ==
In December 2019, a federal judge ruled that the park must relinquish possession of its large cats (two lions and a tiger) after the court found violations of the Endangered Species Act. The judge's ruling described the deaths of two tigers in 2019, and cited "fetid and dystopic conditions" where "filth and feces dominate." The park planned on appealing the ruling prior to its shutdown.
