= Capron Park =

Capron Park could refer to:

- Capron Park in Uxbridge, Massachusetts, United States 42.0860572°N 71.6114616°W
- Capron Park in Attleboro, Massachusetts, United States 41.9377°N 71.2976°W

== See also ==
- Capron Park Zoo
