= Melanie R. Bond =

Biologist, primate scientist and author

Melanie R. Bond is an American biologist, primate scientist and author. She was the first woman to serve as a gorilla keeper at the National Zoo in Washington, D.C. She authored and co-authored several books on primates and animal keeping, including the Orangutan (Pongo) Care Manual for the Association of Zoos & Aquariums.

== Selected publications ==
- Bond, M. R. (1979). Second-generation captive birth of an orang-utan Pongo pygmaeus. International Zoo Yearbook.
- BOND, M. R., & BLOCK, J. A. (1982). Growth and development of twin Orang‐utans. International Zoo Yearbook, 22(1), 256-261.
