= Ross Park Zoo =

- Interactive map of Ross Park Zoo
- 42.062644°N 75.910978°W
- Date opened: 1875
- Location: Binghamton, New York, United States
- No. of animals: 180+
- No. of species: 52
- Website: www.rossparkzoo.org

The Ross Park Zoo is a zoo located in Binghamton, New York, United States. The zoo was opened in 1875, making it the 5th oldest zoo in the nation. The zoo (known as the Binghamton Zoo at Ross Park from 2005 to 2020) is open year-round.

== History ==
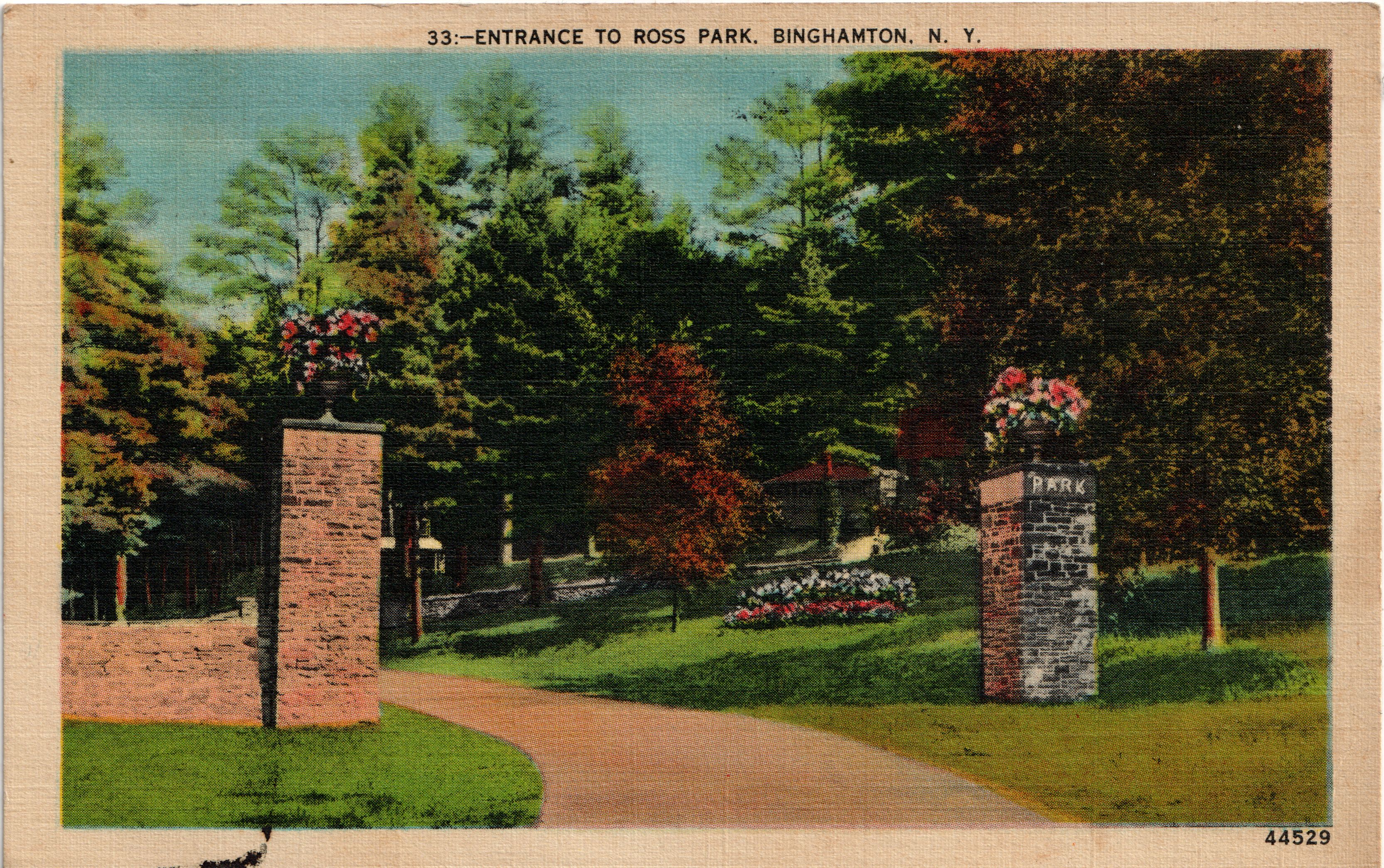
Entrance to Ross Park circa 1939

The 90 acres (36 ha) of land was donated by Erastus Ross, a wealthy businessman whose only instructions were to build a park that all the community could enjoy. The electric trolleys in the area allowed easy access to the park. Other features of the park included roller coasters, swings, a miniature train, and a carousel. Band concerts were a frequent summer event.

Increased use of automobiles let people easily travel outside the city for recreation, this plus the two World Wars and the Great Depression led to the decline of the park. Eventually the USDA was threatening to close the park because of sub-standard exhibits. In 1966, concerned citizens formed the Southern Tier Zoological Society in an attempt to upgrade the facilities.

Mr. Ross donated the zoo enough money to run it for many years. He intended it to be free for all guests as well as the carousel that is on the outskirts of the entrance to the zoo. However, the zoo now has a nominal entrance fee. The carousel still remains free of charge to ride.

In December 2005, the zoo lost its accreditation with the Association of Zoos and Aquariums, "due to turmoil in its previous leadership and finances." Accreditation was successfully regained in 2009, but lost again in 2014. As of 2025, the zoo is an AZA Sustainability Partner with Species Survival Plans for multiple breeds, and is working to regain full accreditation through the AZA Pathway Toward Membership Program.

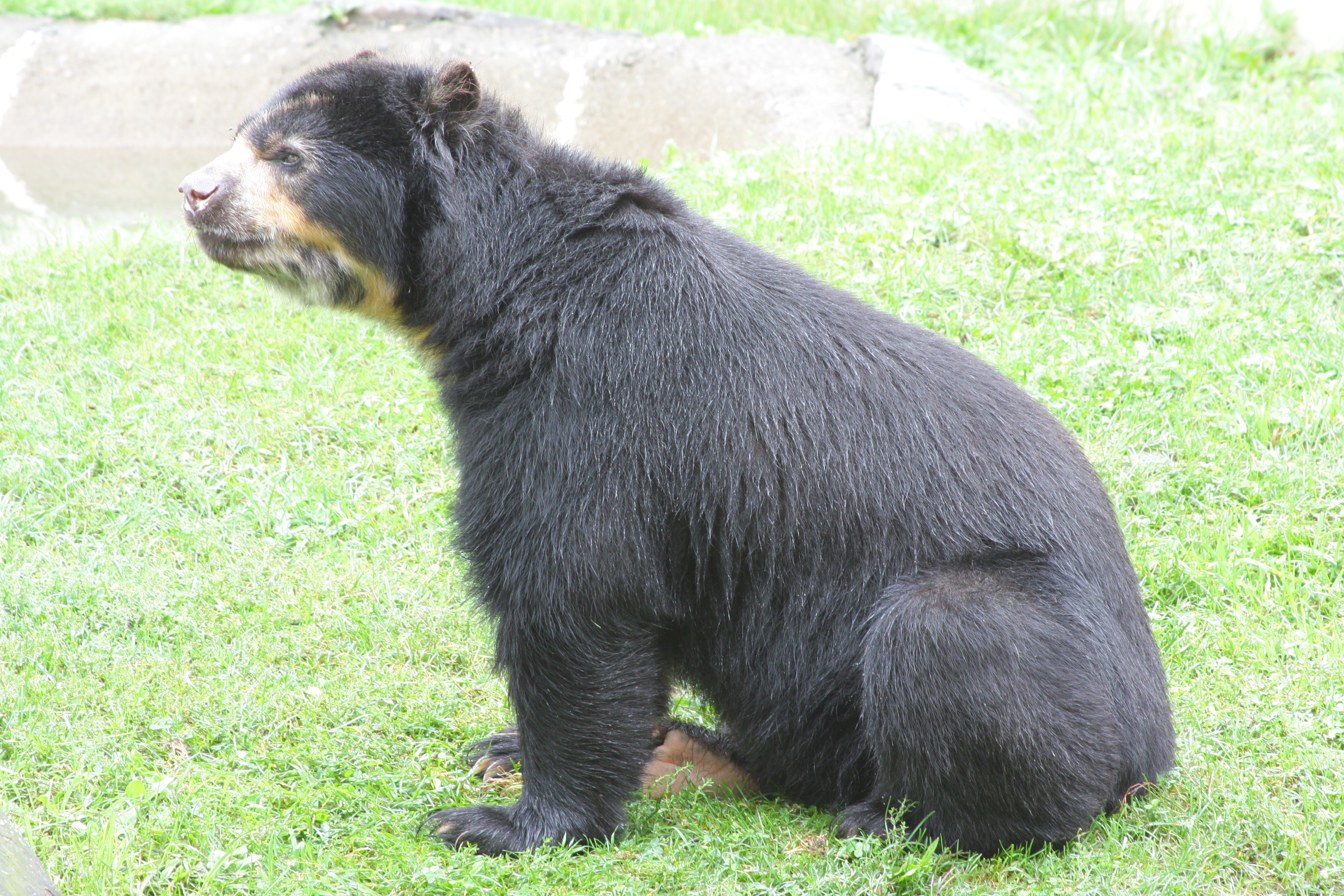
Spectacled Bear

== Animals and facilities ==
The zoo currently contains a growing number of animal exhibits, including red pandas, red wolves, a snow leopard, lemurs, an aviary, penguins, Pallas's cats, howler monkeys, binturongs (also known as bearcats, the mascot of the nearby Binghamton University), and many other animals. It is set in a lushly wooded environment.

The zoo also contains, outside the entrance of the zoo, a pavilion with areas for barbecuing, a small park, and rest rooms. The old lions den has been freshly renovated and is being used for educational programs with seating "behind bars". The zoo is also a neighbor to the Discovery Center, which is a hands-on children's museum.

== Events ==
The zoo also holds many annual events and activities. These events include:

Courtship Tails, Eggstravaganza, Zoo Brew & Wine Too!, Ice Cream Safari, Feast with the Beasts, Howloween at the Zoo, and Boo at the Zoo.
