= Aquarium of Niagara =

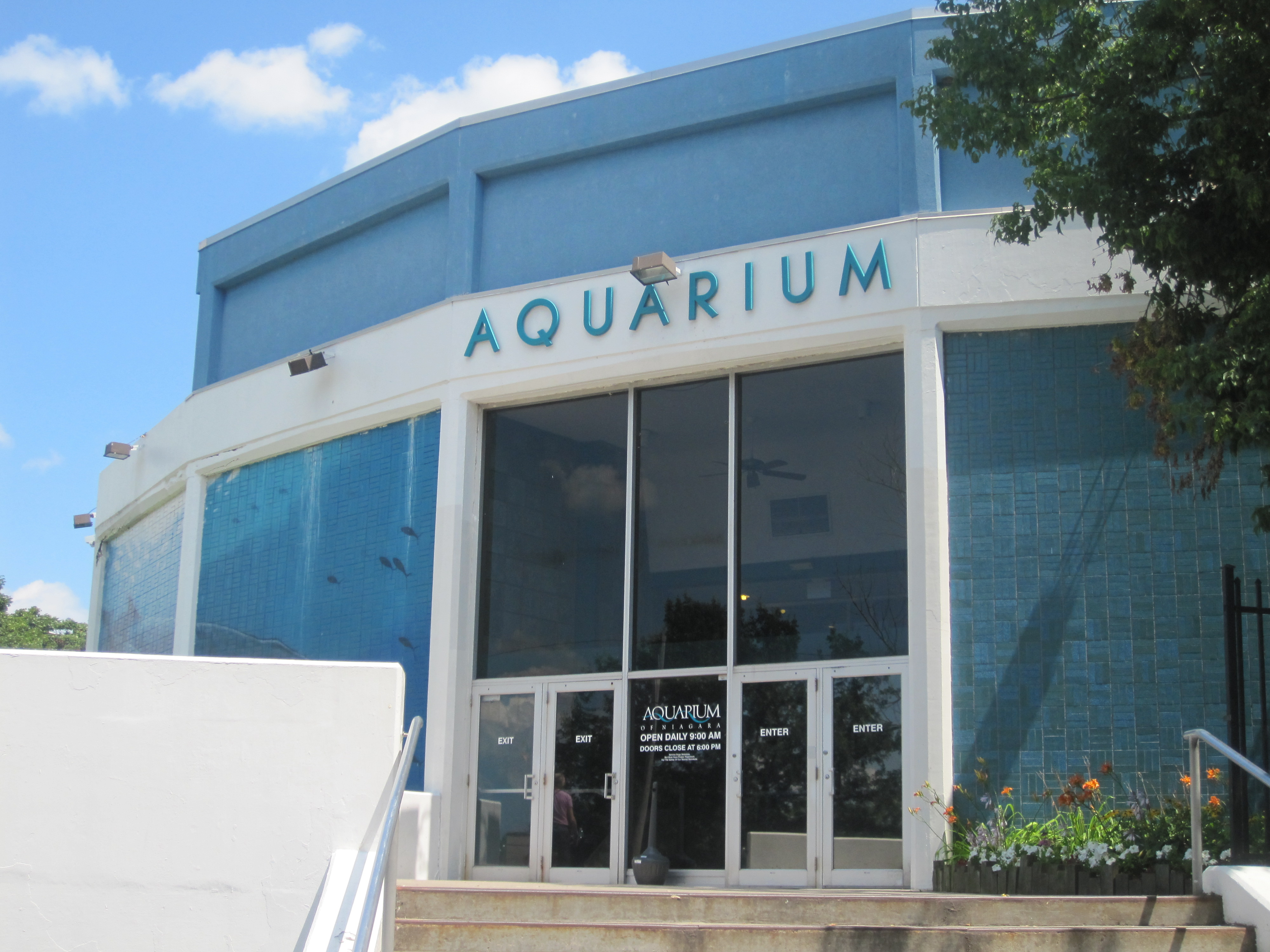
- Interactive map of Aquarium of Niagara
- 43.0943249°N 79.0601435°W
- Date opened: June 12, 1965
- Location: 701 Whirlpool Street, Niagara Falls, New York 14301
- Memberships: Association of Zoos and Aquariums
- Owner: Niagara Aquarium Foundation
- Website: www.aquariumofniagara.org

The Aquarium of Niagara is a non-profit public aquarium in Niagara Falls, New York dedicated to education and conservation of aquatic life. Founded as a private company by a group of researchers and chemists as a test site for a groundbreaking formula for artificial seawater, the Aquarium opened as "The Aquarium of Niagara Falls" on June 12, 1965 as the first inland aquarium in the world to exclusively use this new technology to maintain thriving marine exhibits. Ownership was transferred to a non-profit foundation, the Sea Research Foundation, in September 1977, and then to the Niagara Aquarium Foundation on February 18, 1994.

The aquarium is one organization featuring two buildings — the aquarium's historic Main Building, and Great Lakes 360, which opened in July 2024. The aquarium's Main Building features a wide array of aquatic species found in habitats around the world, including rescued seals and sea lions, Humboldt penguins, jellyfish, and colorful fish. Great Lakes 360 is home to 16 unique exhibits dedicated to the diverse habitats of the Great Lakes ecosystem, and features fish, reptiles, amphibians, and insects. The Aquarium of Niagara is accredited by the Association of Zoos and Aquariums, the Alliance for Marine Mammal Parks and Aquariums, and the International Marine Mammal Trainers Association.

The Niagara Aquarium Foundation is governed by a board of trustees. The board of trustees appoints an executive director, who has immediate charge and control of the administration and operation of the aquarium. The Aquarium of Niagara is currently under the direction of Chad Fifer who was hired as president/CEO in June 2024.

== Major exhibits ==
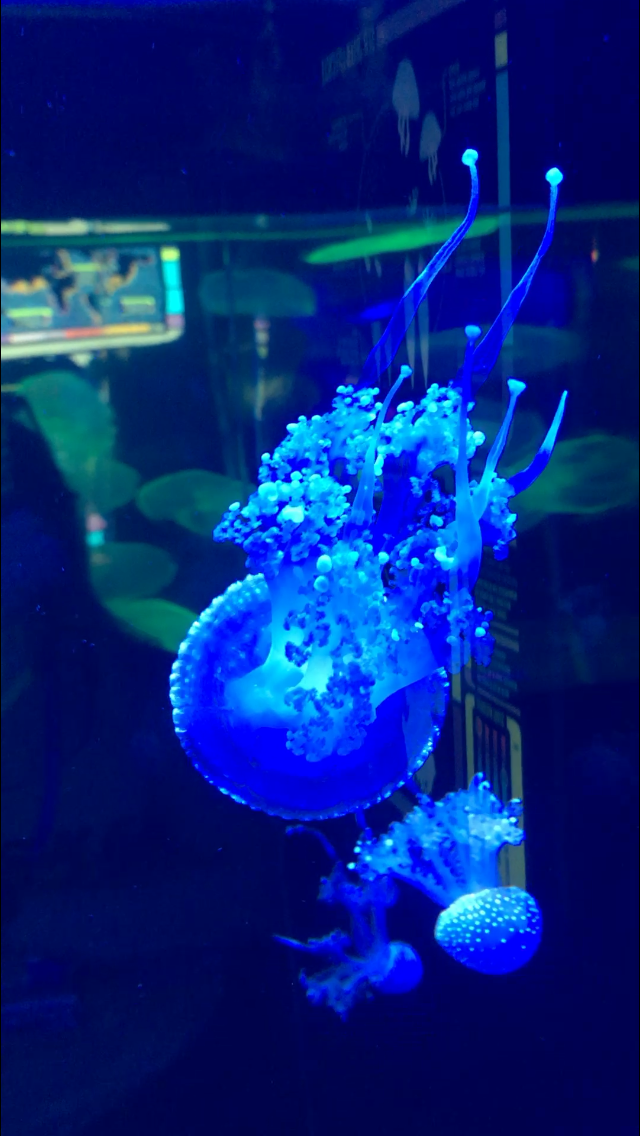
Australian Spotted Jelly

The Aquarium of Niagara is home to more than 180 species of animals, including:

- California sea lions
- Harbor seals
- Grey seals
- Kemp's ridley sea turtle
- Humboldt penguins
- Jellyfish
- Shark & stingray touchpool
- Lake sturgeon touch pool
- Sea lamprey
- Freshwater and marine fish and invertebrates
- Reptiles & amphibians
- Insects

== Programming ==
Experiences included with regular admission include sea lions shows, seal presentations, penguin feedings and educational talks with Aquarium team members. Experiences available for an additional cost include:

- Seal Encounters
- Penguin Encounters
- Trainer for a Day Program
- Birthday Parties
- Sleepover Programs
- Day Camps

The Aquarium of Niagara also offers field trips, outreach programming, and homeschool classes that are all aligned with the aquarium's core values and mission statement, which advocate education and conservation of aquatic life.
