= Western North Carolina Nature Center =

- Interactive map of Western North Carolina Nature Center
- Date opened: May 1973
- Location: Asheville, North Carolina
- Land area: 42 acres (0.17 km^{2}; 17 ha)
- No. of species: 100+
- Memberships: Association of Zoos and Aquariums
- Major exhibits: Brandon's Otter Falls, Appalachian Station Reptile & Amphibian House, Appalachian Predator Loop, Black Bear Ridge, and North Carolina Farm
- Website: https://wildwnc.org/

The Western North Carolina Nature Center is a 42-acre (17 ha) zoological park in Western North Carolina operated by the City of Asheville. It was originally opened in 1925 and known as Recreation Park Zoo, Craig Park Zoo, and Asheville City Zoo and housed a wide variety of native and non-native wildlife. It was then renamed the Children's Zoo and Nature Center in the mid-seventies and was converted to a native wildlife zoo. In 1975, a non-profit charity later named the Friends of the WNC Nature Center was established to develop and fundraise for the improvements which ultimately opened in 1976.

The Center has been accredited by the Association of Zoos and Aquariums since 1999 and its collection features animals native to the southern Appalachian Mountains. In 2013 the center welcomed over 107,000 guests with over 13,000 coming from school children on field trips to the facility.

In 2010, the Center developed an ambitious 2020 Vision master plan, and in 2013 opened the first phase of this plan with a red wolf exhibit that is part of the Association of Zoos and Aquariums' species survival plan and Arachnid Adventure playground.

As both visitation at the WNC Nature Center and wildlife rehabilitation needs in the area grew, the need for a dedicated facility outside the center became clear. Appalachian Wildlife Refuge was established in the fall of 2014 to fulfill this role and, by summer of 2018, began serving as the primary coordinator for all injured and orphaned wildlife in the region.

A new front entrance complex was opened in September 2018. The following February, the Red Pandas became the first of the prehistoric Appalachian animals. The Prehistoric Appalachia exhibits will feature animals – or their closest living relatives – found in the region 15,000 years ago based on excavations done at the Gray Fossil Site, such as red panda (closest living relative of the Bristol's panda). Other animals found at the fossil site include tapir, wolverine, and rhinoceros.

The center's library pass partnership was expanded to 9 local counties in 2022. A limited number of free passes are available by advanced reservation at local library branches to library card holders through these partnerships.
