= Zoo León =

- Interactive map of Zoo León
- 21.1112459°N 101.6597986°W
- Date opened: September 19, 1979
- Location: León, Guanajuato, Mexico
- No. of animals: 2000
- No. of species: 240
- Annual visitors: 600,000
- Website: www.zooleon.org.mx

The Zoo León (formally León Zoological Park, or Parque Zoológico de León in Spanish) is a zoo located in León, Guanajuato, Mexico. The zoo is open 365 days a year.

Zoo León was accredited by the Association of Zoos and Aquariums (AZA).

== History ==
Zoo León was opened in September 1979. Since 1989 it has been owned and operated by the Municipality of León.

In 1994 a veterinary clinic was added to the zoo, and in 2002 the Night Safari was opened.

In 2010 the zoo hosted an extra cost temporary exhibit called "Reptiles and Poisonous Arthropods of the World". The exhibit was designed to familiarize visitors with less popular animals. In addition to five species of snakes that live in Guanajuato, the exhibit included rattlesnakes, pythons, cobras, tarantulas, and other spiders.

== Animals and exhibits ==
The zoo is home to more than 1100 animals of 180 species. Seven of these species cannot be found in other Mexican zoos: warthogs, Amur leopards, flying foxes, mongoose lemurs, Kamchatka bears, sloth bears and raccoon dogs.

The Raptor Cage is claimed to be the largest in the world, and houses golden eagle, bald eagle, red-tailed hawk, Harris hawk, caracara, vultures, and owls and falcons.

At the Children's zoo, visitors can see pet species, as well a primates such as capuchin, green monkeys, macaques, baboons, and three species of lemurs.

The Safari is a 7-hectare (17-acre) exhibit where visitors can see and photograph animals from the African savanna roaming together in an environment similar to their original homes. Visitors can also feed some of these animals.

== Other attractions ==
Visitors can ride a miniature train around the zoo and past its main attractions. The zoo also contains large picnic areas with grills.

== Conservation ==
Since about 2004, the zoo has been breeding the endangered pavón (horned guan). It has also been active in breeding the Mexican gray wolf, which is currently extinct in the wild, and cares for and breeds several species of macaw, including the scarlet macaw.

== The future ==
In 2009, the state government announced that over the next four years it would be spending 40 million pesos to build a new aquarium at the zoo, as well as another 30 million pesos to modernize the zoo, including remodeling the aviary and creating a new children's play area.
