= Grizzly & Wolf Discovery Center =

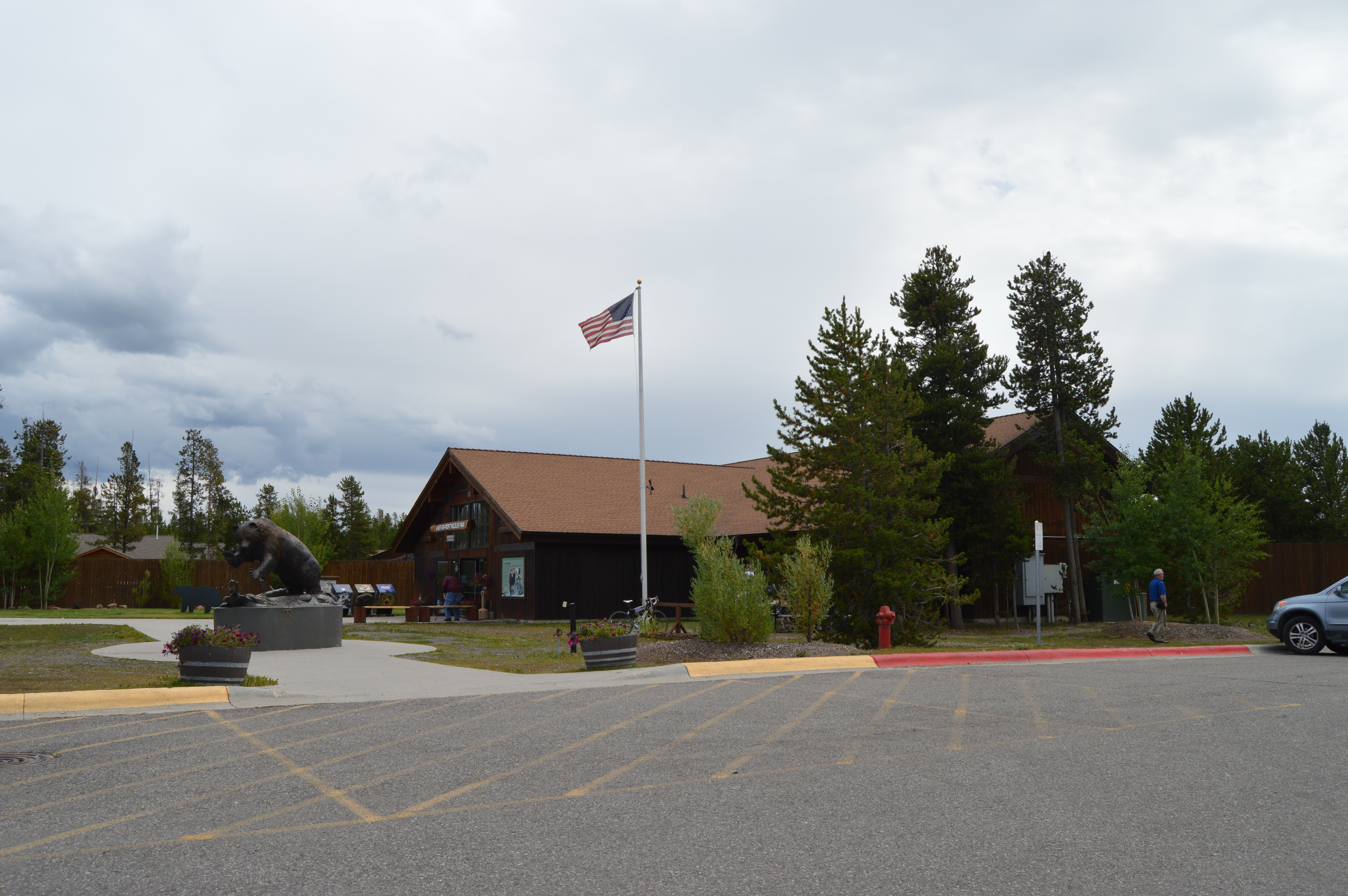
- Interactive map of Grizzly & Wolf Discovery Center
- 44.656951°N 111.098391°W
- Date opened: 1993
- Location: West Yellowstone, Montana
- No. of animals: 150 (2021)
- No. of species: 22 (2021)
- Volume of largest tank: 11,000 square feet (1,000 m^{2})
- Total volume of tanks: 22,000 square feet (2,000 m^{2})
- Annual visitors: 140,000
- Memberships: AZA
- Major exhibits: 14
- Website: www.grizzlydiscoveryctr.org

The Grizzly & Wolf Discovery Center (originally Grizzly Discovery Center) is a not-for-profit wildlife park and educational facility opened in 1993 that is located in West Yellowstone, Montana, United States. It is open 365 days a year, and admission is good for two consecutive days.

The Grizzly & Wolf Discovery Center is accredited by the Association of Zoos and Aquariums (AZA).

== History ==
The Grizzly and Wolf Discovery Center was started by Lewis S. Robinson, and opened in 1993 with three bears as the Grizzly Discovery Center. It was intended as a sanctuary for bears that were removed from the wild because they had become too familiar or aggressive with people. In 1995, the G.D.C was sold to New York-based Ogden Entertainment. A wolf exhibit and ten captive-born wolves were added to the center in 1996.

In 1999, Ogden Entertainment decided to close the center if a buyer could not be found. Three long-term managers of the center formed a non-profit 501(c)(3) corporation and made a $1.7 million offer to include the center and undeveloped land north and south of the center. The offer was accepted, and was financed by a 30-year financing package guaranteed by a United States Department of Agriculture program for rural development.

The center then made agreements with Yellowstone National Park to host some of the park's programs and to test bear resistant containers for the United States Forest Service. In 2001 it received accreditation from the AZA.

In 2002, the center was renamed "Grizzly & Wolf Discovery Center," and purchased two buildings north of the center in order to house the "BEARS: Imagination & Reality" exhibit.

== Exhibits ==
Bears

The bears at the center were all acquired after having become nuisance bears or the orphaned cubs of nuisance bears. They are provided with a large naturalistic outdoor habitat that includes a pool and waterfall, as well as private indoor areas. Bears are rotated into the habitat so that different combinations of bears can interact. Staff hides food in the habitat, and stocks the pond with fish, so that the bears can discover and catch food as they would in the wild.

Bears, Imagination and Reality

This exhibit was originally created by the Science Museum of Minnesota, and is now permanently located at the Grizzly & Wolf Discovery Center after having traveled around the United States. It is an interactive exhibit comparing bears in myth, art, literature, and folklore with the bear known by outdoorsmen and researchers. It contains over 25 taxidermic mounts of grizzly bears and black bears.

Wolves

The center has two packs of wolves. Two other habitats are separated by the Naturalist cabin, and two packs can see each other through the large windows of the cabin. In 2013 the Grizzly and Wolf Discovery Center added a third wolf habitat and a behind the scene wolf exhibit in 2018. In 2021 they connected the wolf exhibit they constructed in 2013 to another wolf yard, thereby extending the enclosure. In May 2019, three wolf pups (two males and one female) arrived at the center. The female was named Shasta and the two males were named Obsidian and Bridger. This pack is called the Hoodoo Pack. In September 2019, two older wolves arrived at the center, a female named Sura and a male named Lakota. This pack has been named the Fossil Butte Pack. In the spring of 2020, Sura gave birth to four pups, two males and two females. These pups will stay at the center and were the first wolves that were ever born at the center. In June 2020, the pups were named Harlequin, Meriwether, Boulder and Colter. In December 2020, Lakota passed away. (Source)

Naturalist Cabin

The Naturalist Cabin, located between the center's two wolf habitats, lets visitors see two separate wolf packs from the same indoor location through large floor to ceiling windows facing each of the packs. The cabin also includes interpretive displays and a National Geographic film on wolves, and provides a place for the daily "Pack Chat."

Ground squirrel Exhibit

In 2015, the Grizzly and Wolf Discovery Center added a unit of Ground Squirrel Exhibit that allows guests a deeper appreciation of predator and prey relationships. Unlike the center's bears, the Ground Squirrels are allowed to go through their natural hibernation. They emerge in March and go back into hibernation in August. (Source)

Bird Of Prey Exhibits

In 2013, the Grizzly and Wolf Discovery Center added four new bird of prey exhibits that house raptors that can no longer survive in the wild. In 2014 the center added an additional bird of prey exhibit and renovated the former golden eagle aviary into a new home for their bald eagles. The exhibit is open from April to November. (Source)

Warming hut

in 2016 the Grizzly and Wolf Discovery Center built a new viewing area for the bears called the Warming Hut. This new viewing area allows guests to view the bears while staying warm as well. (Source)

Other attractions

In 2014, the Grizzly and Wolf Discovery Center built a new exhibit called Bears on Easy Street. It is an exhibit that teaches people how to be bear aware and also ways to keep bears away from their house. In 2013, the Grizzly and Wolf Discovery Center opened a new kitchen behind the scenes, as well as a new playground area for children. A new outdoor amphitheater was added in 2014. (Source)

‘’’Banks of the Yellowstone’’’ In 2019, the center opened its new Banks of the Yellowstone Exhibit. This new exhibit complex features large freshwater aquariums for North American river otters, Cutthroat Trout, Arctic Grayling, Tiger salamanders Columbia spotted frog, Rubber Boa And Garter Snake. The center also expanded the River Valley wolf habitat and connected the exhibit to the riparian building. (Source)

== Future ==
Future plans for the Grizzly and Wolf Discovery Center includes a new bear den and black bear habitat. The new 8 additional bear dens will help save bears from being euthanized in the surrounding area. The bear den will be filled with a couple of resident bears and the rest will temporarily house rescued bears before they find them a new permanent home. The new bear habitat will feature river rapids for the bears to play in, trout for the bears to hunt for and will also rotate in and out of their habitat throughout the day. The new bear exhibit will be developed on the remaining acre of undeveloped GWDC land. Both of these projects are currently underway and will continue to make progress through financial support.
