= Temaikèn =

Coordinates: 34°21′50″S 58°48′10″W

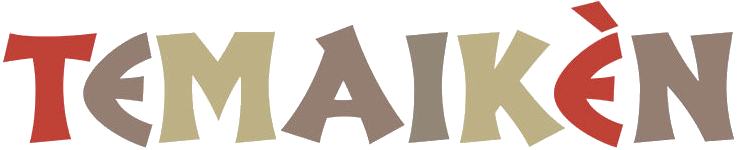

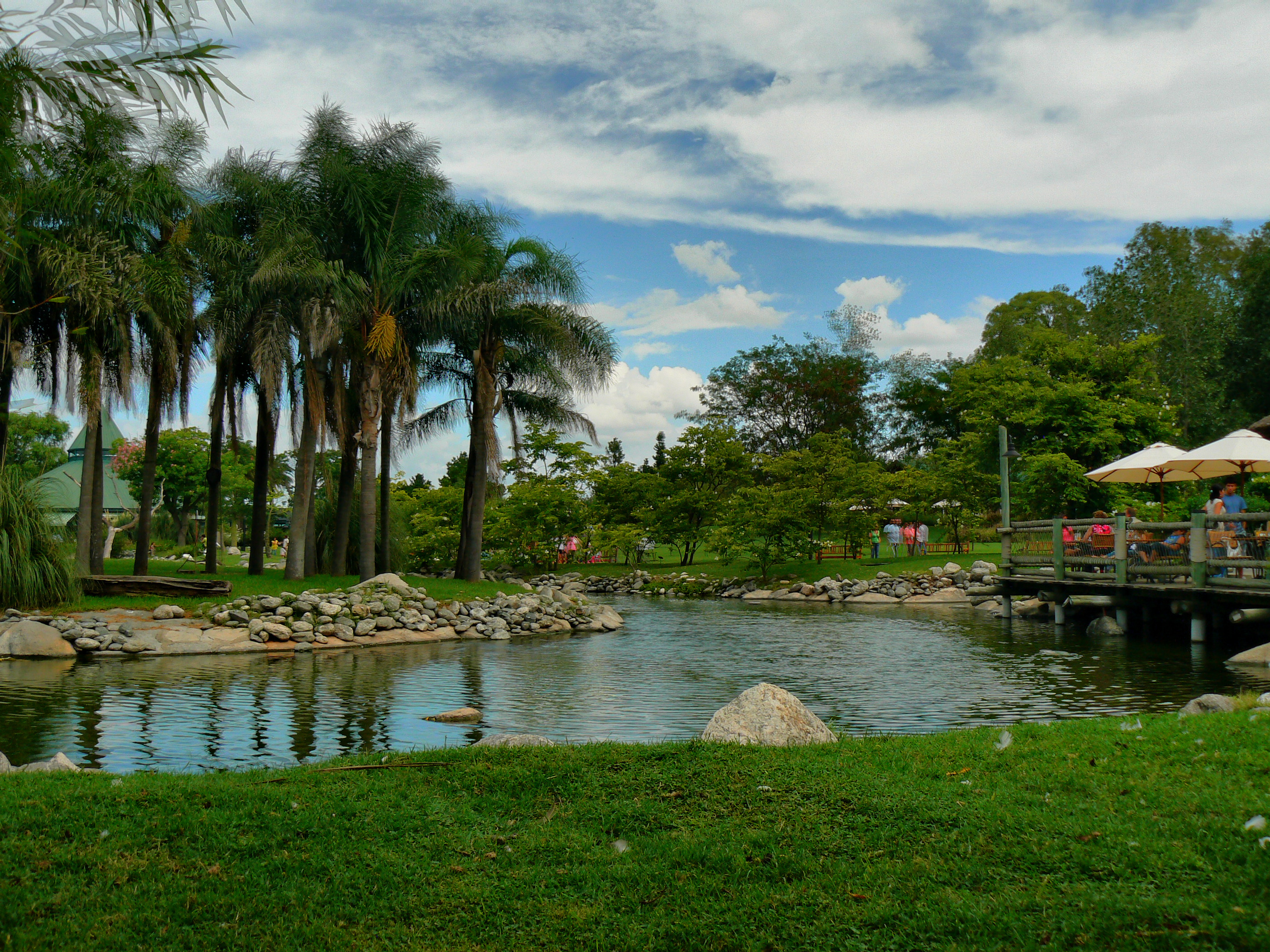
- Interactive map of Temaikèn
- Location: Belén de Escobar, vicinity of Buenos Aires, Argentina
- Land area: 72 hectares (180 acres)

Temaikèn (Bioparque Temaikèn) is a zoo in Belén de Escobar, vicinity of Buenos Aires, Argentina. It is the only AZA accredited zoo in the country. The name is a portmanteau of tem (earth) and aiken (life) in the language of the native Tehuelche people.

== About ==
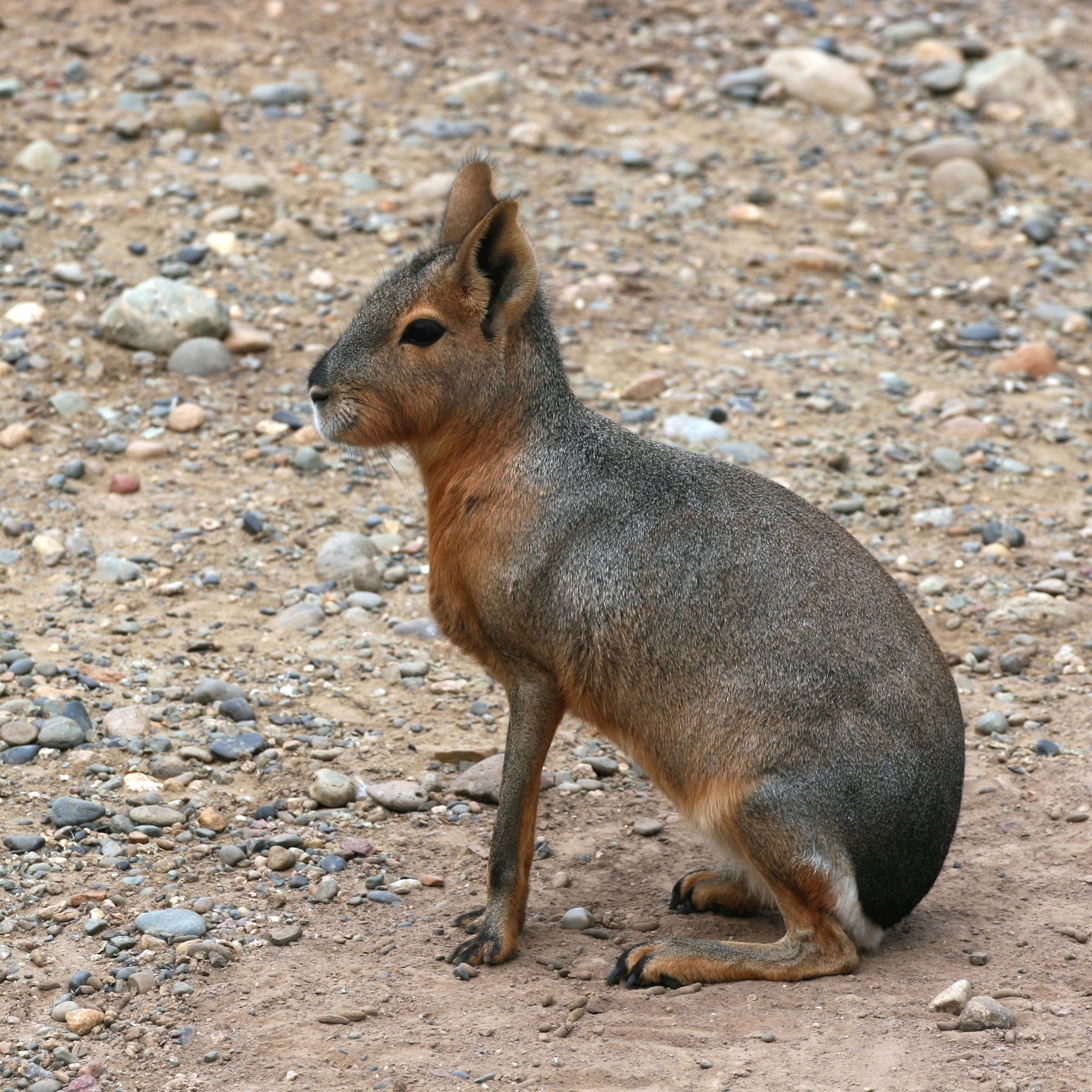
Patagonian Mara at Temaiken Zoo

Covering 72 hectares, Temaikèn specializes in native Argentine wildlife and exotic and threatened species. In addition to the zoo the Temaikèn Foundation owns the Osununú wildlife conservation area. It also has programs to manage and protect the Paraná Pine ecosystem and butterflies and orchids within the national wildlife conservation system.

Temaikèn Biopark is a popular tourist destination.
