= Hutchinson Zoo =

- Interactive map of Hutchinson Zoo
- 38.029108°N 97.916712°W
- Date opened: 1986
- Location: Hutchinson, Kansas
- Land area: 9 acres (3.6 ha)
- No. of animals: 160
- Memberships: AZA
- Public transit: Rcat
- Website: hutchinsonzoo.org

The Hutchinson Zoo is a small 9-acre (3.6 ha) zoo located in Hutchinson, Kansas, United States. The Hutchinson Zoo has been accredited by the Association of Zoos and Aquariums (AZA) since 1997.

== History ==
Planning for the zoo began in 1983, and the zoo was opened on May 23, 1986.

In 2003, the zoo opened a visitor center that is supposed to look like a log cabin.

A flood in 2007 caused the zoo to close for four months, as well as a flood in 2019.

== Exhibits ==
The zoo focuses primarily on animals native to Kansas and the United States, but also has exotic species.

=== Bison ===
The zoo began featuring bison in 1985; bison are a species indigenous to Kansas, but rarely found in the wild. The bison are not in the main part of the zoo, but across a pond where they can range and graze, and are only visible from the zoo train. The zoo now has emphasized breeding pure bison as part of its mission.

=== Black-footed ferrets ===
In 1998, the zoo began displaying black-footed ferrets. The black-footed ferret is one of the most endangered species in North America, and the Hutchinson Zoo was the first zoo in Kansas to house them.

=== Prairie dogs ===
One of the exhibits features prairie dogs. Along with the exhibit there is a tunneling system for children that allows them to see into the prairie dog tunnels. Flooding in 2007 completely filled the viewing tunnel with water. In 2010, the Hutchinson Zoo housed around 175 prairie dogs for a short time, as their natural habitat was in the way of a nearby construction project.

=== Tamarin monkeys ===
The zoo has housed tamarin monkeys, two of which were born in 1999. The cotton-top tamarin monkeys are a part of the AZA's Species Survival Program. In 2014, several of these monkeys died due to a virus spread by mice.

=== Animals and Man ===
One exhibit at the zoo is the "Animals and Man" exhibit, which features domesticated animals from various countries that visitors can pet.

=== Aquarium ===
The zoo has various fish and aquatic animals on display.

Early in December 2016, a brown banded bamboo shark joined the collection after it was hatched.

== Attractions ==
=== Prairie Thunder Railroad ===
One of the main attractions is the Prairie Thunder Railroad, a train that goes throughout the zoo. The train has been operating since 2003, and nearly 10,000 people ride it each year. The journey takes about eight minutes.

=== Boo at the Zoo ===
Every year the zoo has a program around Halloween where children can come to the zoo dressed in costumes and trick-or-treat.

== Rehabilitation program ==
The zoo is one of four places in Kansas that offers animal rehabilitation services. The zoo began their animal rehabilitation program in 1991. In their first year they rehabilitated thirteen animals. Various animals, including bald eagles have been rehabilitated through this program. In 2004, the zoo rehabilitation program had grown to rehabilitate over 600 animals.

In 2012, the zoo began to limit the number and type of animals they would help, due to concerns that people were bringing in animals who were not actually in need of assistance and because some animals may bring disease or illness to the zoo.
