= Sea Life Kansas City =

- Interactive map of Sea Life Kansas City
- 39.0821°N 94.5812°W
- Location: Kansas City, Missouri
- Owner: Merlin Entertainments
- Website: www.visitsealife.com/kansas-city/

Sea Life Kansas City is an interactive aquarium located at the Crown Center in Kansas City, Missouri. The aquarium contains thousands of aquatic creatures, plus interactive touch pools and a 360° ocean tunnel. Sea Life Kansas City is owned and operated by Merlin Entertainments.

== Main species ==
| Blacktip reef shark | Giant Pacific octopus | Hermit crab | Cownosed ray | Big-belly seahorse |
| Jellyfish | Clownfish | Green sea turtle | Lionfish | Starfish |

== Conservation ==
Sea Life is involved with a number of conservation activities. These include:

=== Seahorse breeding ===
Sea Life has successfully bred and reared nine species of seahorse, helping prevent the breeds from becoming extinct. This means that no seahorses will be taken from the wild for their exhibitions, and they may be able to resupply seahorses if they become extinct in the wild.

=== Seal rescues ===
Sea Life works with seal sanctuaries to care for orphaned and injured seal pups. Over 100 seals are successfully rescued and returned to the wild each year.

=== Re-homing ===
Sea Life provides permanent homes for injured or disabled aquatic creatures who would have otherwise been killed or euthanized.

=== Protection of turtles ===
A fundraising campaign run by Sea Life has enabled a new Sea Turtle Rescue and Wildlife Information Centre to be built on the Greek island of Zakynthos to treat turtles which have been injured in collisions with pleasure craft or entanglement in fishing gear.
