= Capron Park Zoo =

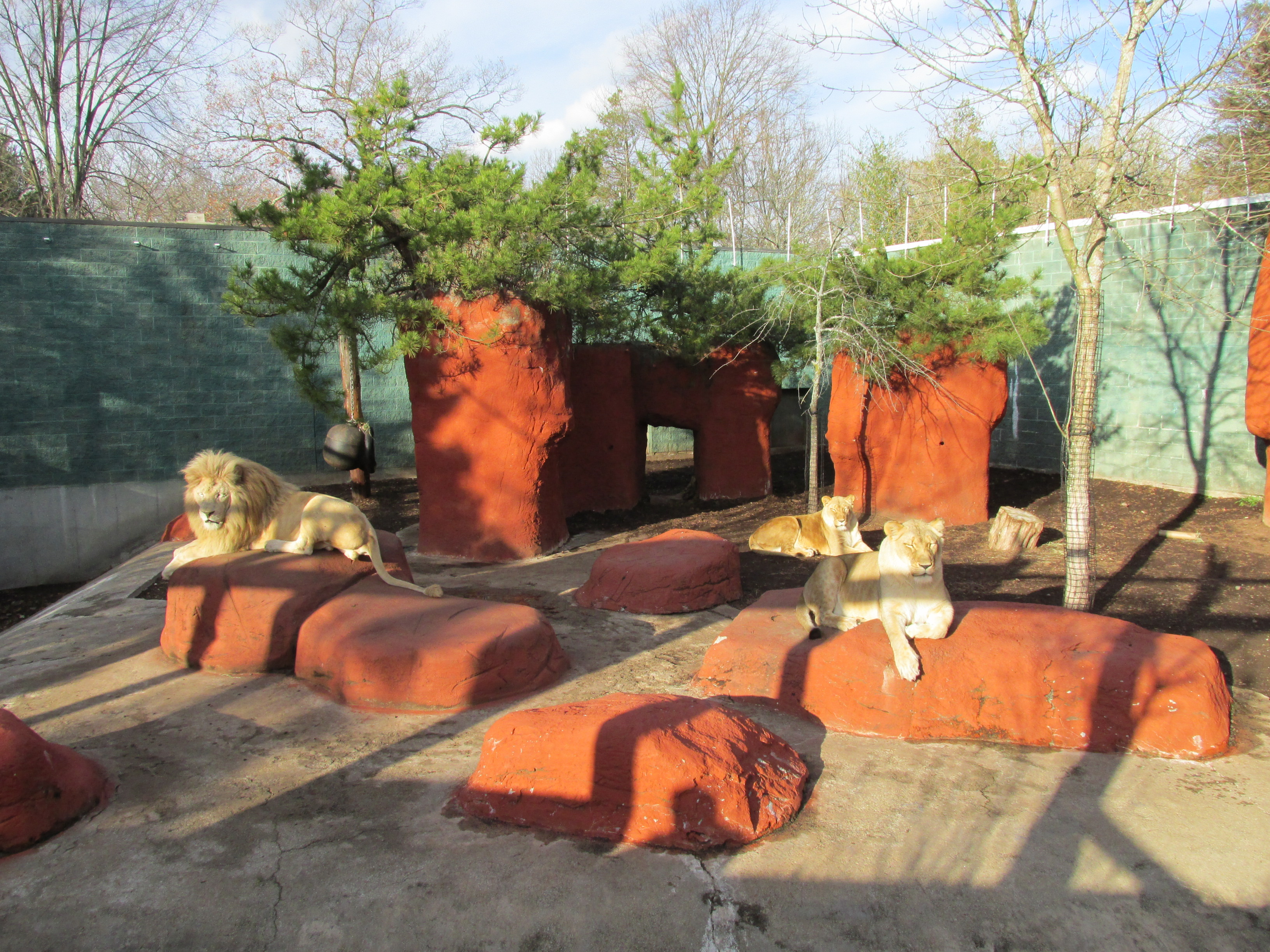
- Lions
- Interactive map of Capron Park Zoo
- 41.9377°N 71.2976°W
- Date opened: 1937
- Location: Attleboro, Massachusetts, United States
- Land area: 8 acres (3.2 ha)
- No. of animals: 100
- No. of species: 44
- Annual visitors: 64,000
- Memberships: AZA
- Website: www.capronparkzoo.com

The Capron Park Zoo is a small 8-acre (3.2 ha) zoo that opened in 1937 in Attleboro, Massachusetts, United States. It is home to about 100 animals representing 44 species and is an accredited member of both the Association of Zoos and Aquariums (AZA) and the Association of Zoo and Aquarium Docents (AZAD). It participates in the Species Survival Plan program.

== History ==
In 1925, local school children started fundraising with a goal to build zoo. In 1937, Capron Park Zoo opened on 8 acres (3.2 ha) of the 33 acres (13 ha) donated by the Capron family.

== Education ==
The education department for children opened in 1991, a year after the renovated zoo opened. The education department promotes environmental education, and teaches children about the interaction between animals, and how the zoo works.

The Capron Park Zoo offers the public educational programs and recreational activities dedicated to furthering the understanding of animals.

== Exhibits ==
Exhibits at the zoo include North and South American, Asian, African, and Australian animals such as agouti, emu, green tree python, kangaroo, lemur, white lion, meerkats, sloth bear, and Amur leopard.

The zoo includes a nocturnal building, where visitors can observe nocturnal animals, and an indoor rainforest exhibit with porcupine, fruit bats, a two-toed sloth, and many birds.
