= FrogWatch =

Citizen science program

A FrogWatch is any of several citizen science programs in which laypeople monitor amphibians. In a FrogWatch, people make recordings of frogs and other animals that live near them and send the recordings to databases for scientists and other people to hear and study.

Not all FrogWatch programs are run by the same people. The Akron Zoo runs FrogWatch USA, Nature Canada runs FrogWatch Canada, the India Biodiversity Portal runs the FrogWatch in India, and other organizations run FrogWatches in other countries.

The National Geographic Society developed the program that FrogWatch USA volunteers use to add information and that FrogWatch uses to study it. Volunteers record temperature with thermometers and listen for sounds made by specific types of frogs and toads. FrogWatch USA volunteers record frog habitats for three and a half minutes, starting one half-hour (30 minutes) after the sun goes down.

In 2006, the National Wildlife Federation assessed the utility of FrogWatch USA for the U.S. Geological Survey and published its findings. It recommended continued funding based on "scientific value alone," though it also acknowledged its value as an educational tool and its ability to render research more cost-efficient.

Scientists have used FrogWatch to study the way frogs and toads change the places they live, which types of frogs are becoming more numerous and which are becoming less numerous, species diversity, the way species react to changes in temperature, and the way they act during different parts of the year.

== History ==
The United States Geological Survey started FrogWatch USA in 1998, but the National Wildlife Federation took over in 2002.

Between 1998 and 2005, 1,395 people working with FrogWatch USA visited 1,942 places where frogs live and gave information to FrogWatch. They found 79 different kinds of frogs and toads. This does not count visits, places, or species for FrogWatch Canada or FrogWatches in other countries.

FrogWatch NT operates in northern Australia. It began in 1991 after cane toads came to Australia and became a problematic invasive species.
