= Alameda Park Zoo =

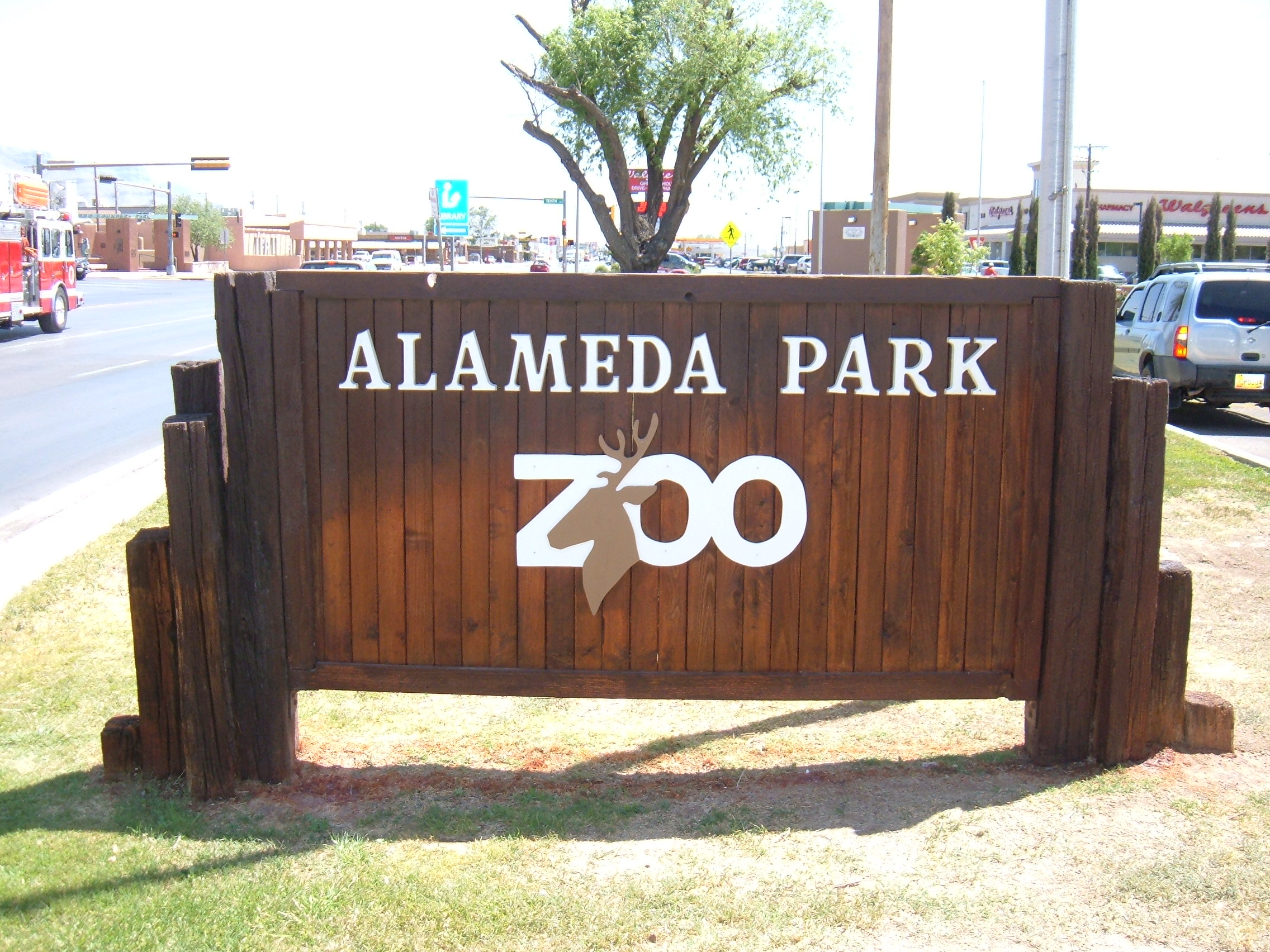
- Zoo sign on White Sands Blvd

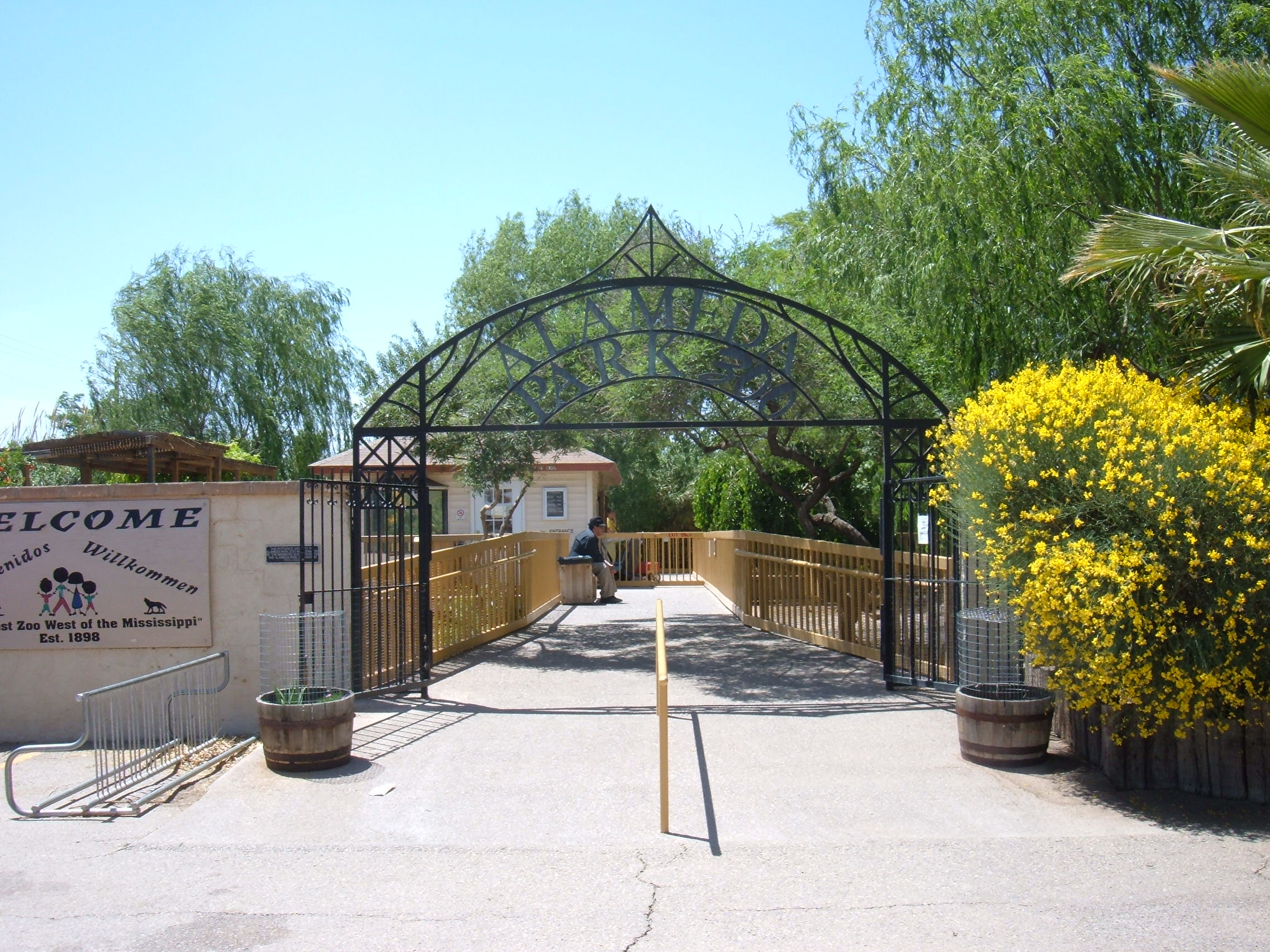
- Entrance gate and entrance bridge over the duck pond
- Interactive map of Alameda Park Zoo
- 32.9015°N 105.9610°W
- Date opened: 1898
- Location: White Sands Blvd at 10th Street, Alamogordo, New Mexico United States
- Land area: 13 acres (5.3 ha)
- No. of animals: 265
- No. of species: 90
- Annual visitors: 60,000
- Website: ci.alamogordo.nm.us/coa/communityservices/zoo.htm

Alameda Park Zoo, located in Alamogordo, New Mexico, was founded in 1898 and claims to be the oldest zoo in the Southwestern United States. It participates in the Species Survival Plan for the Mexican wolf.

== Features ==
Notable species at the zoo include the White Sands pupfish, the Mexican wolf, the Hawaiian goose, and the Ring-tailed Lemurs.

The zoo is a Species Survival Plan Captive Facility for the Mexican gray wolf, and in 2006 there were two wolves resident in the zoo. Three Mexican gray wolf pups were born at the zoo in 1994, and seven in 1995.

The zoo receives birds of prey that have been injured and are non-releasable.

Some special exhibits include a lemur exhibit, a birds of prey exhibit, and a butterfly garden.

Several programs operate in the Educational Center, including an Eco-Ranger Junior Zookeeper program. The center is also open to the public for viewing videos and reading books from the collection. Some animals are housed in the center.

== History ==
The zoo was created in 1898 at its present location at the south end of Alameda Park to entertain train passengers while they waited for the train to refuel. In the early days the zoo received gifts of exotic pets such as raccoons, skunks and birds from local residents. Cages in the early days were made of chain-link fencing, and these were gradually replaced beginning in the 1970s and 1980s. The zoo went into decline in the 1970s, and in a 1987 interview the zoo director said that in the mid-70s "the zoo was a dilapidated menagerie". The zoo had become a hangout for loiterers and drug dealers, and the city was faced with a decision to either shut down the zoo or upgrade it. They chose to upgrade, and a perimeter fence was added in 1986 to control access.

The zoo is sometimes claimed to be the "oldest zoo west of the Mississippi". However, there are several older zoos, including

- Oregon Zoo (founded 1887)
- Dallas Zoo (founded 1888),
- Henry Doorly Zoo (Omaha, founded 1894)
- Denver Zoo (founded 1896)

Even the more modest claim that Alameda Park Zoo is the oldest zoo in the Southwestern United States depends on the definition of Southwest, as Denver and Dallas are sometimes considered to be in the Southwest.

== Gallery ==
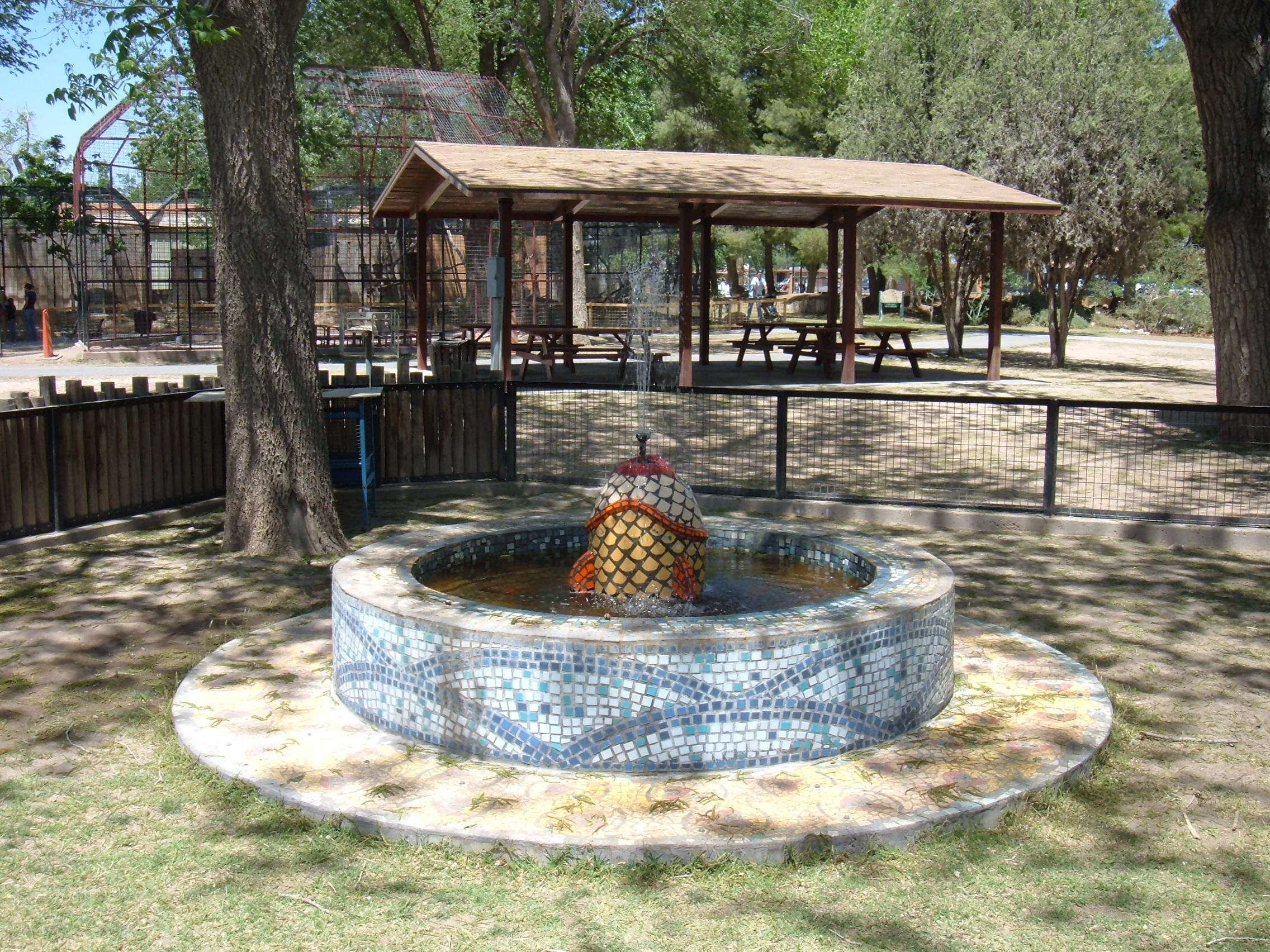
Memorial Fountain

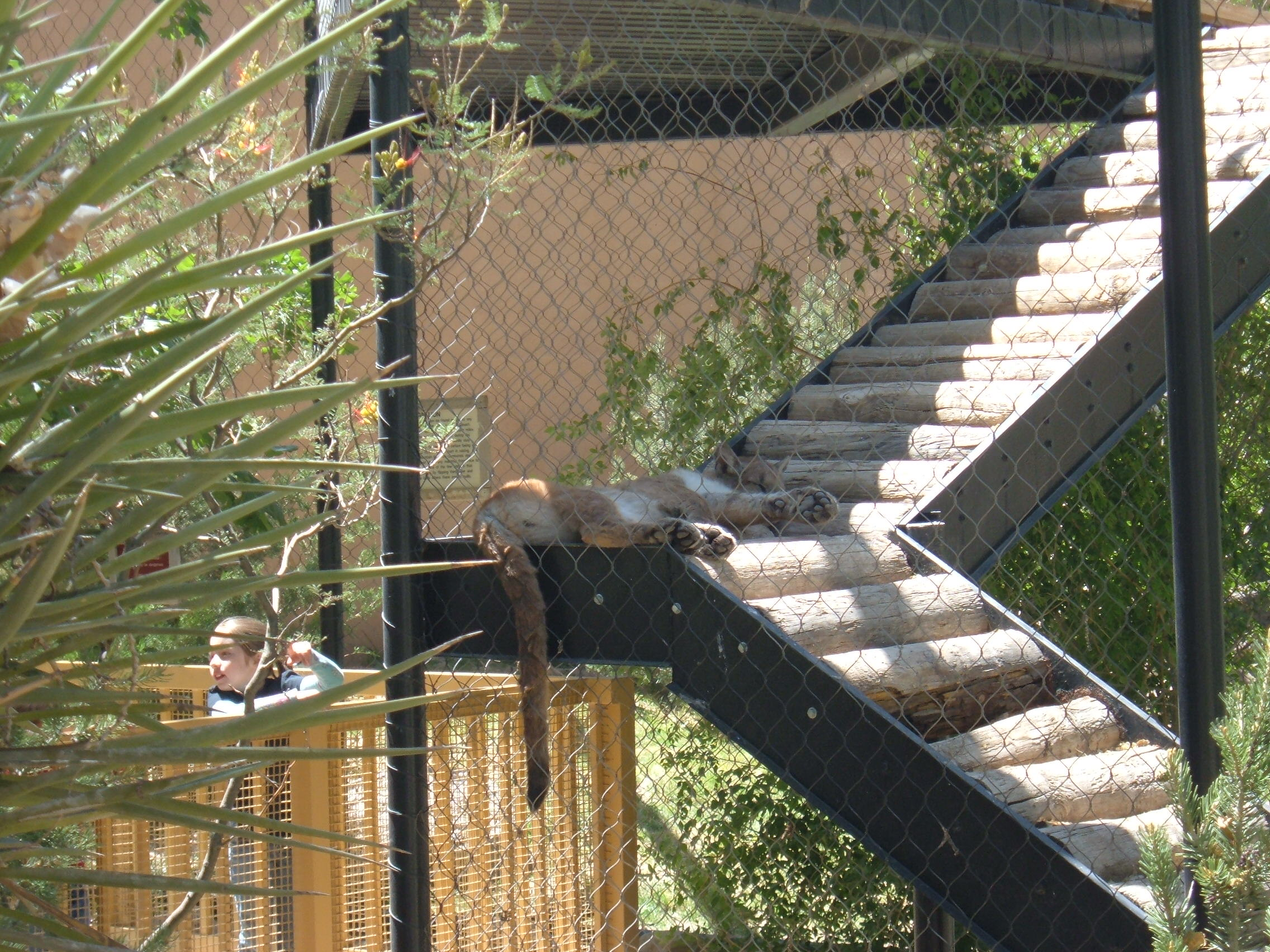
Puma sleeping on steps

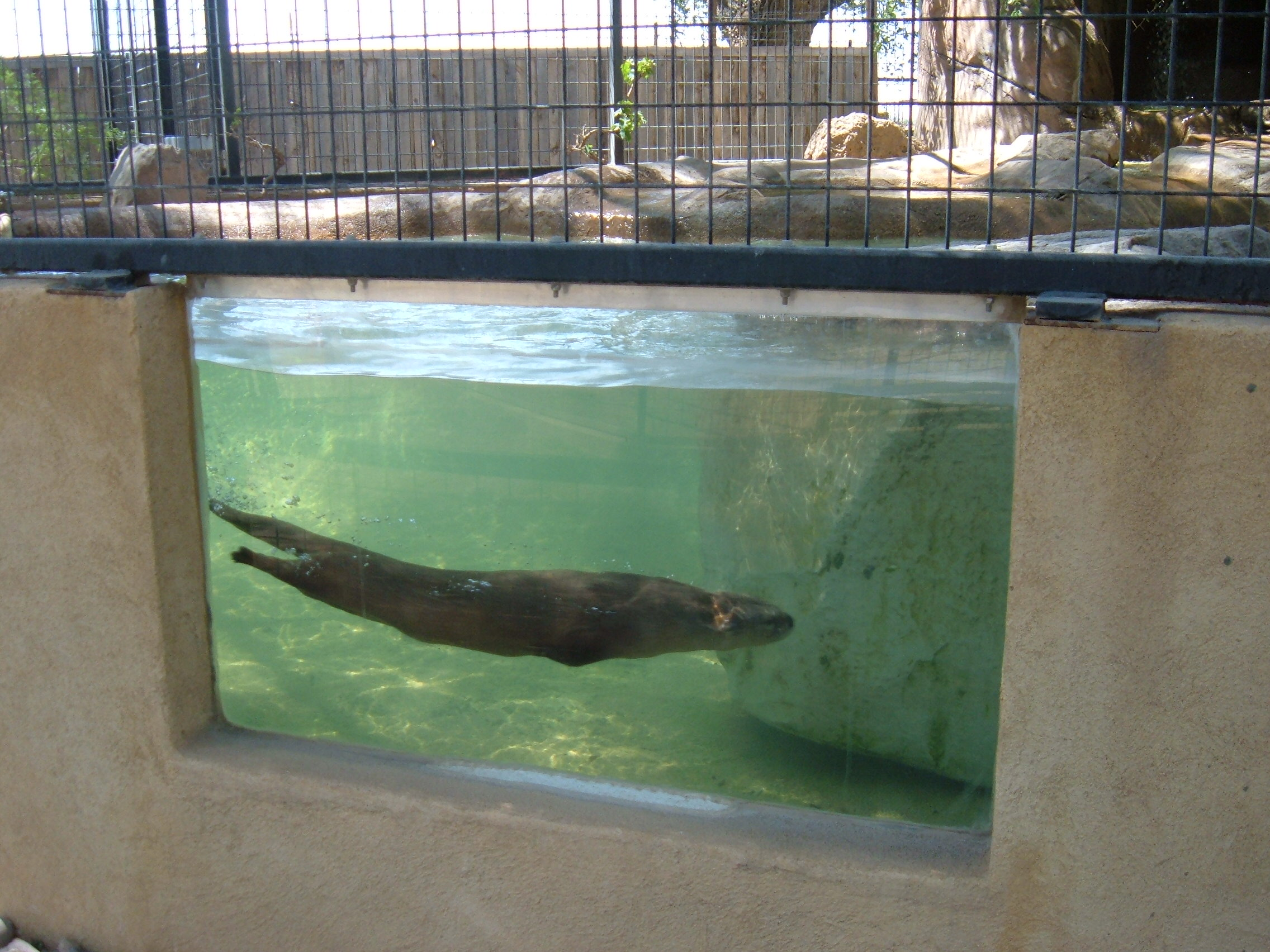
River otter

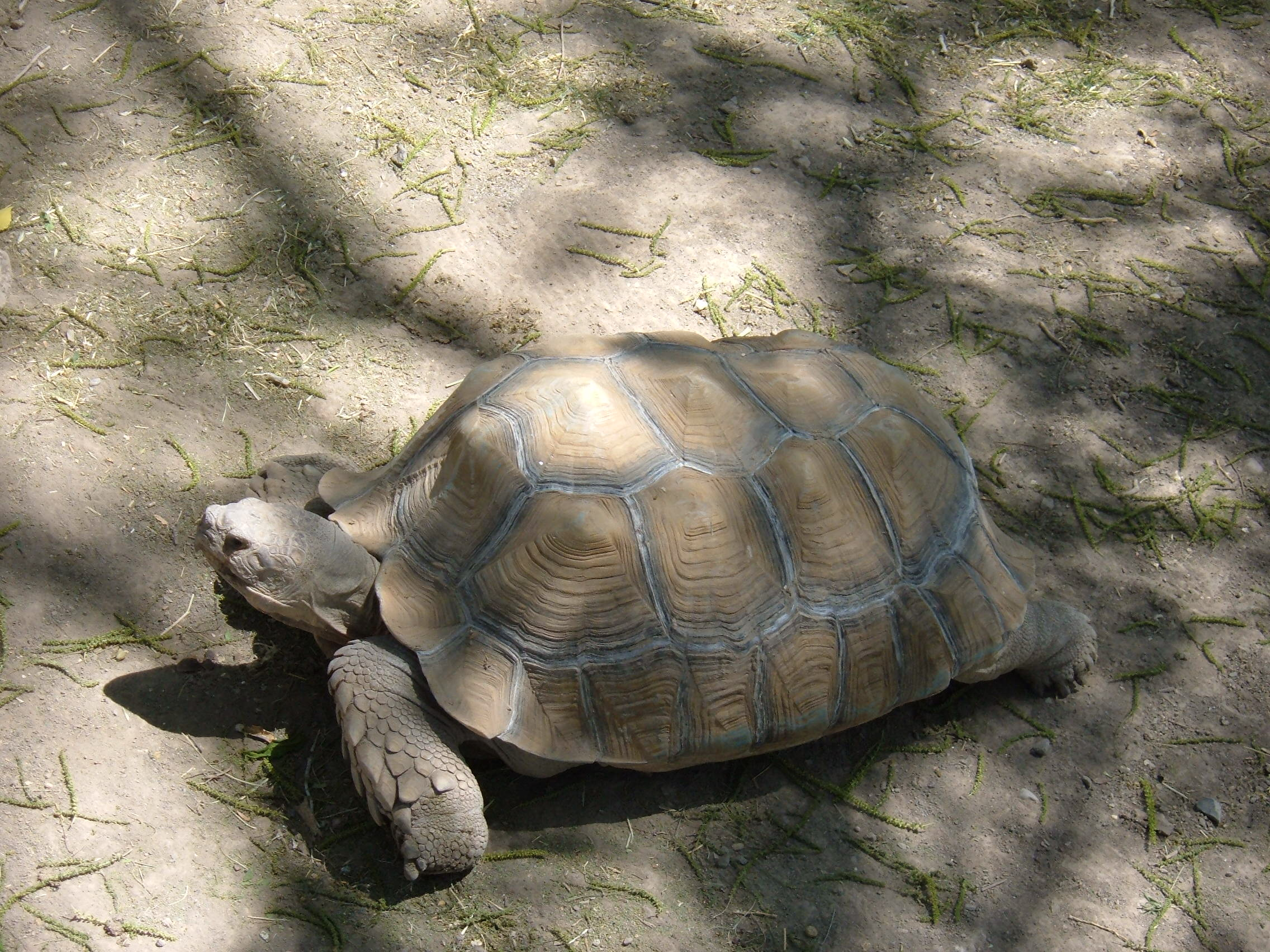
Buford, about 2 feet (0.61 m) long
