= Palo Alto Junior Museum and Zoo =

Science museum and zoo in Palo Alto, California, United States

Coordinates: 37°26′38″N 122°08′39″W

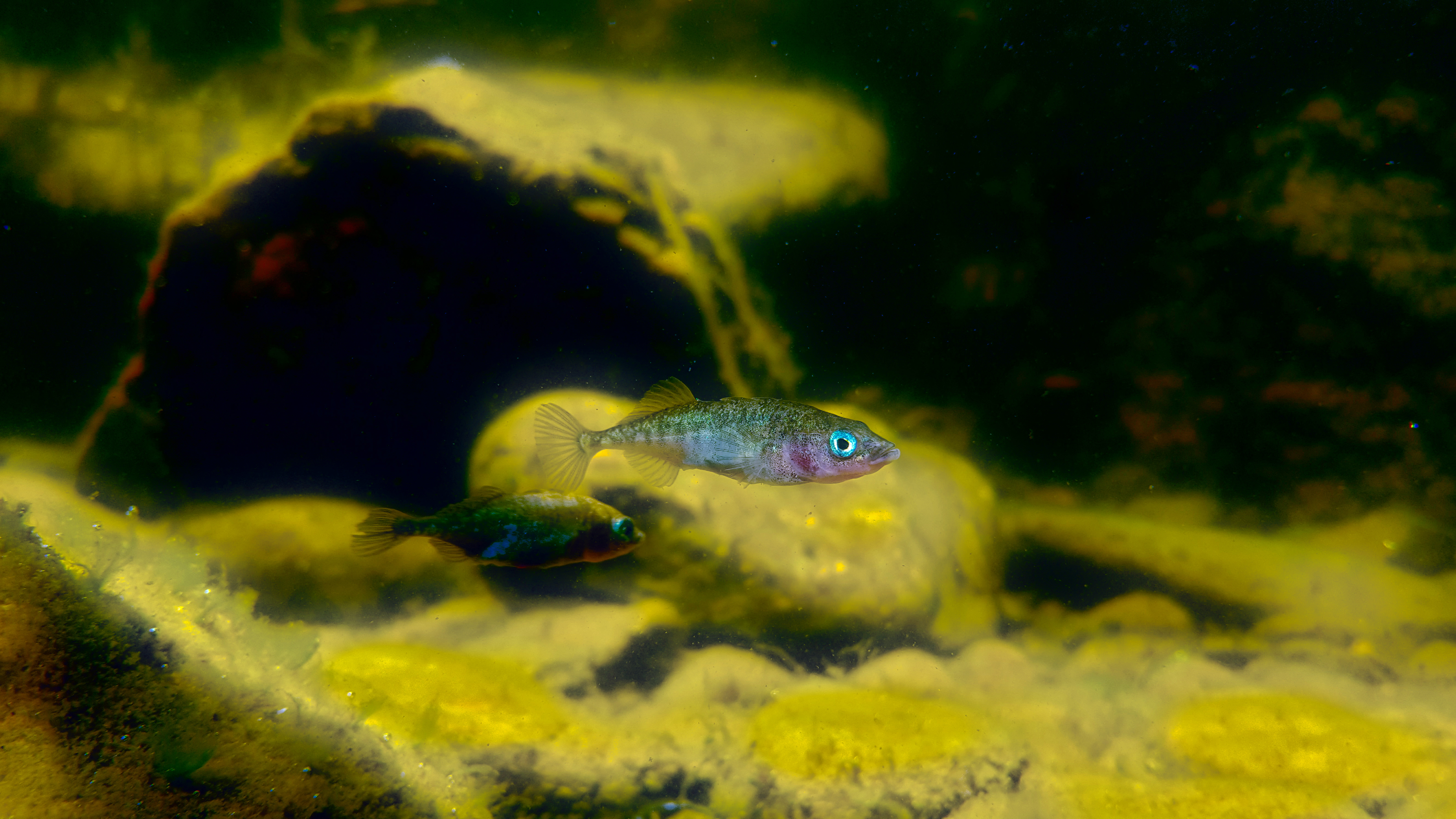
- Three-spined stickleback at the zoo.
- Interactive map of Palo Alto Junior Museum and Zoo
- Location: Palo Alto, California
- No. of species: 200
- Owner: City of Palo Alto
- Website: Official website

Palo Alto Junior Museum and Zoo is located in Palo Alto, California and part of the City of Palo Alto's Community Services Department (CSD). It was founded in 1934 by Josephine O’Hara in the basement of a local elementary school.

The small zoo holds approximately 200 species of mostly indigenous wildlife such as bobcats, raccoons, hedgehogs, ducks, bats, snakes and more. The museum has an interactive scientific exhibition that is changed every few years. They offer science classes to local students, over 14,000 students a year.

== Major reconstruction ==
In December 2017, Palo Alto's City Council unanimously approved plans for a $25 million reconstruction project. The facility re-opened to the public in 2021.
