= Roy Bengis =

South African veterinary wildlife specialist

- Born: October 12, 1946 (age 79)
- Education: University of Pretoria; University of Mississippi
- Children: 1

Roy Bengis is a South African veterinary wildlife specialist who served as the Chief State Veterinarian in the Kruger National Park for 34 years. A graduate of the University of Pretoria and the University of Mississippi, in May 2015 Bengis received the Gold Medal award from the World Organisation for Animal Health in international recognition of his outstanding contributions to the field of veterinary science.

== Biography ==
After receiving his Doctorate in Physiology, Bengis lectured undergraduates at the University of Pennsylvania and at the University of Mississippi Medical Centre in Jackson, Mississippi. He served as a veterinary consultant to the Philadelphia Zoo and to the Jackson Zoo in Mississippi, USA before his appointment as State Veterinarian at Skukuza, Kruger National Park in South Africa in 1978.

He retired from his position as Chief State Veterinarian in 2011, and continues to be active in the fields of wildlife disease surveillance, monitoring and control, epidemiological research, wildlife immobilisation, wildlife translocation risk assessment, and wildlife forensics.

== Education ==
Bengis graduated with a B.VSc. from the Faculty of Veterinary Science at the University of Pretoria, and was awarded a M.Sc. and Ph.D. degree in Physiology from the University of Mississippi in 1978. He has published more than 100 articles in scientific publications.

== Memberships and service ==
A member of the Royal College of Veterinary Surgeons (London) from 1972 to 2006, Bengis was elected a Fellow of the Royal Society of South Africa in 2004. Other memberships include the South African Society for Veterinary Epidemiology and Preventative Medicine and the Game Rangers Association of Africa. Bengis served as the South African representative on the Great Limpopo Transfrontier Park Conservation committee and Veterinary Sub-Committee from 2002 to 2011.

== Awards and accolades ==
Among Bengis' awards are the Sir Arnold Theiler Memorial Medal for excellence and service in the field of Veterinary Science (2012) and the President's Award from the South African Veterinary Association, in recognition of outstanding service to and advancement of the veterinary profession in South Africa. In May 2015 Bengis received the Gold Medal award from the World Organisation for Animal Health in international recognition of his outstanding technical, scientific and administrative contributions to the field of veterinary science.
