= White buffalo =

American bison considered sacred in several Native American religions

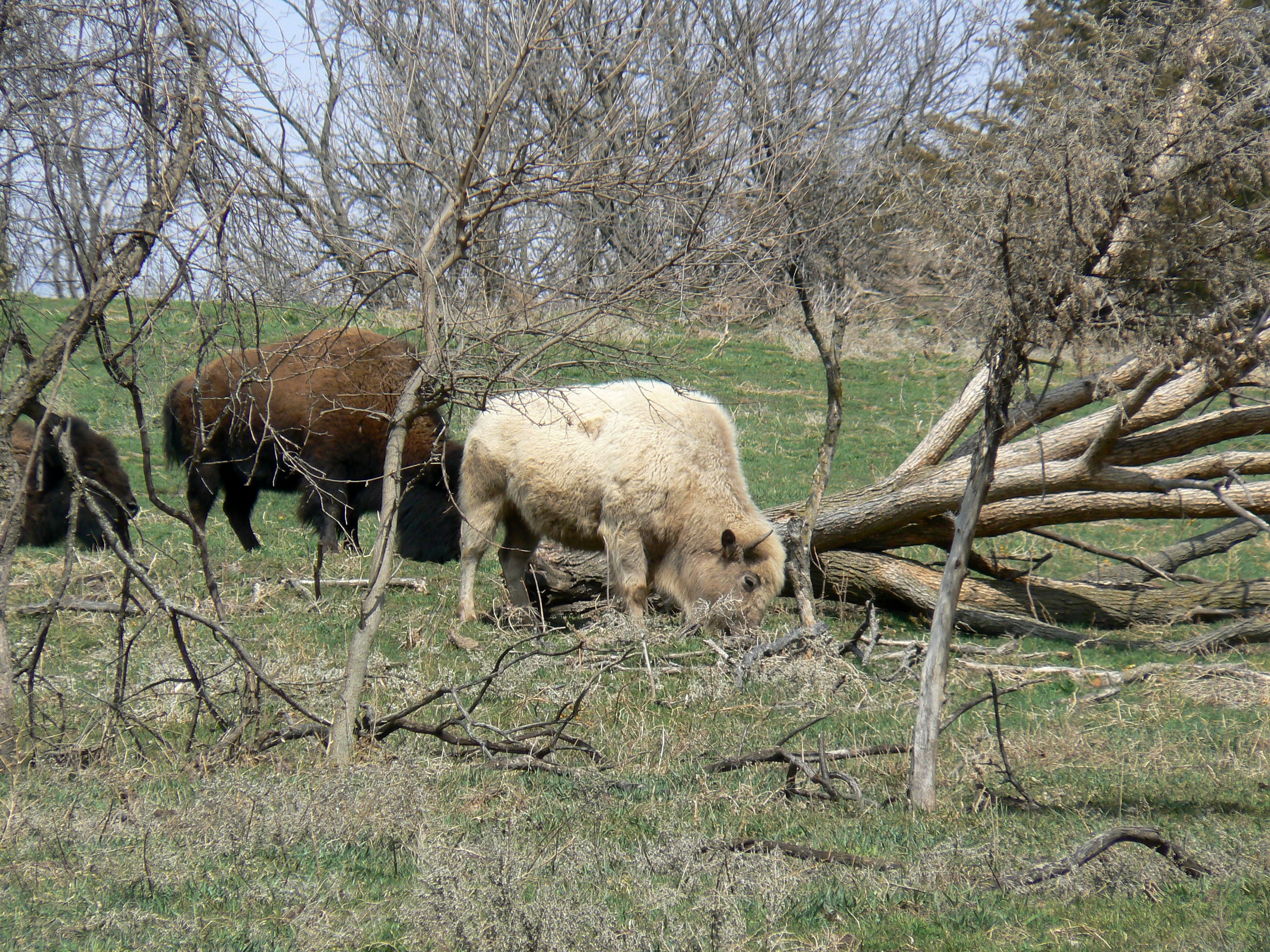
A white buffalo at the Lee G. Simmons Conservation Park and Safari in Ashland, Nebraska. This animal is not a true white buffalo, being 1/16 Charolais cattle. It is expected that its coat will darken as it matures.

A white buffalo or white bison is an American bison possessing white fur, and is considered sacred or spiritually significant in several Native American religions; therefore, such buffalo are often visited for prayer and other religious rituals. The coats of buffalo are almost always brown and their skin a dark brown or black; however, white buffalo can result from one of several physical conditions:

- They may be albinos, in which case they will remain unpigmented throughout their lives, and may also have hearing and vision problems.
- They may be leucistic, with white fur but blue eyes, instead of the pink seen in albinos.
- They may have a rare genetic condition which causes a buffalo to be born white, but to become brown within a year or two as it matures.
- They may be beefalo, a bison–cattle crossbreed, and thus have inherited the white coloration from their cattle ancestry.

== Spiritual significance ==
The white buffalo is a sacred sign in Lakota and other Plains Indians religions. Chief Arvol Looking Horse is the current keeper of the Sacred White Buffalo Calf Pipe.

The story of the pipe is that,

"Nineteen generations ago the beautiful spirit we now refer to as White Buffalo Calf Woman brought the Sacred C’anupa (Sacred Pipe) to our People. She taught the People the Seven Sacred Rites and how to walk on Mother Earth in a sacred manner. Pte-san win-yan. As she left, she turned into a young beautiful white buffalo and then she walked over the hill and out of sight. This is where she received her name, White Buffalo Calf Woman. She gifted us with the Seven Sacred Rites that still sustain our People today. The person who smokes the sacred pipe achieves union with all Beings. By smoking this C’anupa, you will make direct personal contact with the Great Mystery. . . Following the Way of this Sacred C’anupa, you will walk in a sacred way upon the earth, for the Earth is your grandmother and your mother and she is sacred. . .″

— Chief Arvol Looking Horse

The story is also a prophecy. White Buffalo Calf Woman told the people that she would return in the form of a white buffalo calf and that it would be both a blessing and a warning. When the white animal shows its sacred color there will be great changes upon the earth. The births in the early 1990s and 2000s of white buffalo calves were seen by indigenous Americans to be worrying portents. Arvol and many others interpret those changes to mean the current ecological crises taking place. If humanity continues to live without harmony with the earth it will be cursed, but if spiritual unity and harmony with the earth is achieved humanity will be blessed.

== Individual white buffalo ==
- In 1833, a white bison was killed by the Cheyenne. The Cheyenne killed this white bison during the Leonid Meteor Shower (The Night the Stars Fell) and scribed a peace and trade treaty on its skin. This event was documented by historian Josiah Gregg and other travelers on the Santa Fe Trail.
- On October 7, 1876, a buffalo hunter named J. Wright Mooar killed a white buffalo in the Deep Creek drainage near Snyder, Texas. He retained the hide his entire life, despite reports that Theodore Roosevelt offered him $5000 for the hide. White Buffalo Park is presently located near the site of the shooting.

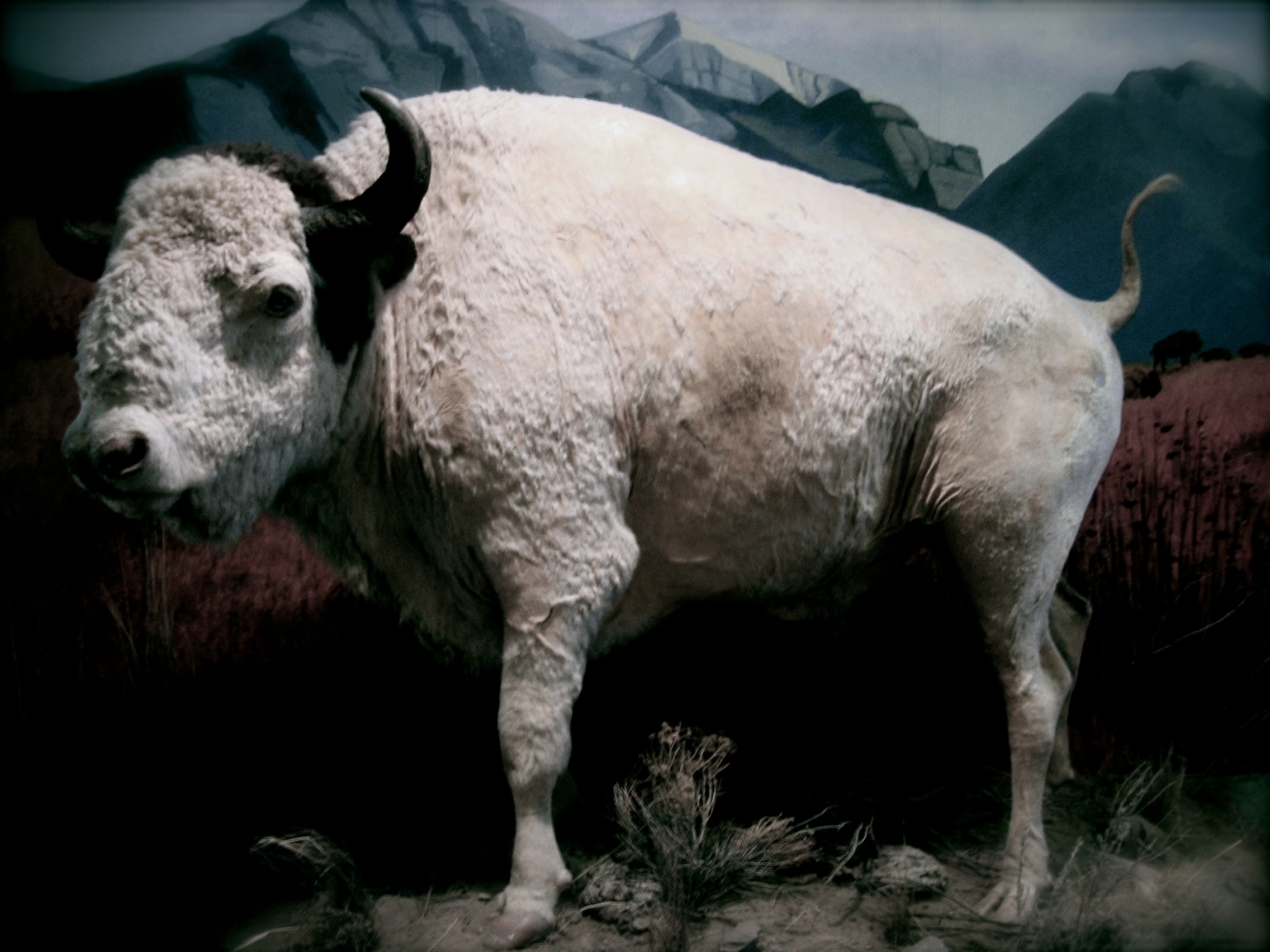
Big Medicine on display at the Montana Historical Society museum (2005)

- A bison named Big Medicine (1933–1959) was born in the wild on the National Bison Range on Flathead Indian Reservation in Montana. The name "Big Medicine" was chosen due to the sacred power attributed to white bison. Following its death in 1959, its body was preserved and is being displayed at the Montana Historical Society in Helena.
- A white buffalo was recorded at the U.S. Army Arctic Testing Center, Fort Greely, Alaska. There is a copyrighted photograph of it in Seeing the White Buffalo by Robert Pickering. This buffalo was part of a herd that had been relocated from Montana.
- A female named Miracle (not to be confused with Miracle Moon), was born at a farm near Janesville, Wisconsin, on August 20, 1994. Her fur fully transitioned to brown as she matured, and she gave birth to four calves of her own before dying of natural causes on September 19, 2004. Additionally, a calf died aged 4 days in 1996. A third white calf was born in August 2006 which died after being struck by lightning in November of the same year. Kathleen Buerer wrote a memoir about her 1994 visits to Miracle, By the Side of the Buffalo Pasture.
- Medicine Wheel, a white buffalo was born on May 9, 1996, on the Pine Ridge Indian Reservation in Pine Ridge, South Dakota, on the Merrival farm. In 2000, Medicine Wheel escaped his pasture and was shot by a tribal police officer.
- Mahpiya Ska (Sioux language) or White Cloud was an albino female buffalo born on July 10, 1996, at Shirek Buffalo Ranch. After her birth, she was loaned to the city of Jamestown, North Dakota, where she lived out the most of her life. Through genetic testing, she was certified a true Albino American Bison. She died on November 14, 2016, shortly after being returned to her birthplace.
  - White Cloud had a white calf on August 31, 2007, which was named Dakota Miracle. While Dakota Miracle was white like his mother, he was not a true albino. He lived out his entire life at the National Buffalo Museum in Jamestown before dying on June 28, 2019, due to complications from leucism.
- Spirit Mountain Ranch donated a herd of white buffalo to the Sacred World Peace Church and Alliance, The SWPA has successfully bred six generations of white buffalo starting from a single white female, almost all with brown fathers. Their herd includes 17 white buffalo as of February 23, 2015:
  - Miracle Moon (female, born April 30, 1997), calf of Big Momma (brown). Miracle Moon (the first white of this line) has been DNA tested, and is shown to be 100% buffalo, or bison.
  - Rainbow Spirit (female, born June 8, 2000, calf of Miracle Moon)
  - Mandela Peace Pilgrim (female, born July 18, 2001, calf of Miracle Moon)
  - Arizona Spirit (male, born July 1, 2002, calf of Miracle Moon)
  - Sunrise Spirit (female, born May 22, 2004, calf of Mandela Peace Pilgrim)
  - Spirit Thunder (male, born May 27, 2004, calf of Rainbow Spirit)
  - Chief Hiawatha (male, born May 16, 2005, calf of Miracle Moon)
- Tupelo Buffalo Park and Zoo in Tupelo, Mississippi, owned a white buffalo bull named Tukota ("Too-ko-ta")
- Female calf born on August 7, 2001 at the Double E Buffalo Ranch in Vanderbilt, Michigan
- A male white buffalo named Spirit of Peace was born on April 17, 2005, on the Blatz Bison Ranch in Fort St. John, British Columbia. Spirit of Peace died on June 1 of the same year, probably as a result of his premature birth.
- A female white buffalo calf was born in Shelbyville, Kentucky, on June 3, 2005, at Buffalo Crossing, a buffalo ranch and tourist facility. She was named Cante Pejute (Medicine Heart in the Lakota language) in a traditional ceremony led by Steve McCullough, a Lakota/Shawnee from Indiana.
- A male named Blizzard was born in March 2006 on the farm of an anonymous rancher, who arranged to have the calf transported to Assiniboine Park Zoo in Winnipeg, Manitoba, in recognition of his spiritual significance to First Nations people.
- A third white buffalo was born on the Heider farm (see "Miracle" above) on August 25, 2006. The male calf was named Miracle's Second Chance and was unrelated to Miracle. The Heiders planned to breed the male with the descendants of Miracle, but during a thunderstorm late November 26, 2006, five buffalo on the Heider farm were killed in a lightning strike, including Miracle's Second Chance.
- Lightning, formerly known as Kenahkihinén (Kĕ-Nah‛-Ki-Nĕn, from the Lenape language meaning 'Watch Over Us'), a male white buffalo, was born November 12, 2006, at Woodland Zoo in Farmington, Pennsylvania.
- On May 31, 2008, a third white calf was born to a normal brown two-year-old at the National Buffalo Museum, Jamestown, North Dakota.
- On May 9, 2011, a white buffalo calf Silver Spirit was born to Mother Miracle Moon.
- On May 12, 2011, a white male buffalo calf named Lightning Medicine Cloud (Wakinya Pejuta Mahpiya in Lakota) was born near Greenville, Texas during a thunderstorm on the ranch of Arby Little Soldier. In May 2012, less than year after its birth, Lightning Medicine Cloud was found dead, thought to have been butchered and skinned by an unknown individual; his mother was found dead the next day. A necropsy determined that they died of natural causes, from a bacterial infection called blackleg. In April 2012, Lightning Medicine Cloud's father was killed by a lightning strike.
- On June 16, 2012, a white male buffalo calf was born on Peter Fay's dairy farm in Goshen, Connecticut. The calf was temporarily called Tatanka Ska ('white buffalo' in Lakota). Four elders from the Oglala Sioux Tribe, along with Fay and members of the Lakota, Seneca, Mohawk, and Cayuga tribes, performed a naming ceremony on July 28 at the farm; the calf was named Yellow Medicine Dancing Boy. Fay plans to care for the buffalo rather than sell it for meat.
- On July 4, 2012, a white female buffalo calf named "Baby" was born on Steve and Carol Sarff's Countryside Buffalo Ranch in Avon, Minnesota. She died on July 20.
- On May 7, 2016, a white buffalo mother gave birth to a white male buffalo calf at Sioux Valley Dakota Nation in Manitoba. As of 2022, there are eight white buffalo in Sioux Valley.
- White buffalo can be found in the village of Questa, New Mexico.
- Ghostbuster, a white female buffalo, was donated to the City of Hays, Kansas in the summer of 2017 by a local rancher.
- On March 29, 2018, a white female buffalo calf named "Dušanka" was born at the Belgrade Zoo, Serbia. She was named after the Christian holiday of Pentecost.
- On October 30, 2018, a white buffalo calf was born on Lakota Territorial land.
- In June 2020, a white buffalo named ‘Faith’ was born at Bitterroot Bison in Lolo, Montana. She was moved to a sanctuary to be kept safe after discovering that she was blind.
- In December 2020, Wildlife Prairie Park obtained two leucistic white bison from a farm where they were kept as pets: the male Tatanka and female Lakota. Tatanka and Lakota had one offspring in April 2021, Tallulah, who is also white. Tatanka died shortly after showing signs of illness in October 2022. Lakota gave birth to another white bison in February 2023.
- May 3, 2021, White Buffalo calf Snow Moon was born on Siksika Nation.
- June 16, 2022, a white buffalo calf was born on the land of the Turtle Mountain Band of Chippewa Tribe in Belcourt, North Dakota.
- June 4, 2024, a white buffalo calf was born in Yellowstone National Park and was photographed a few minutes later by the visitor Erin Braaten. Lakota Sioux chief Arvol Looking Horse said in an interview with the Associated Press "The birth of this calf is both a blessing and warning. We must do more," while Troy Heinert, executive director of the South Dakota–based InterTribal Buffalo Council said that the buffalo appeared genuine as it has a black nose, black hooves and dark eyes.

== In popular culture ==
The flag of Wyoming

- A white silhouette of a bison is featured in the flag of the state of Wyoming. The bison is the state mammal; it is branded with the Great Seal of Wyoming. White represents purity, uprightness and one of the colors of the United States flag.
- The U.S. National Park Service's Arrowhead Emblem, commonly worn as a patch on an employee's uniform, incorporates a white buffalo.
- A charging white buffalo over crossed swords is used as the logo for the NHL team, the Buffalo Sabres. A white buffalo head was used from 1996 to 2006.
- American hard rock musician Ted Nugent has a tune that he wrote and sings called "Great White Buffalo", alluding both to the creature and to the frequent conflicts between indigenous tribes and spreading pioneers. The track appears on albums such as 2009's Playlist: The Very Best of Ted Nugent.
- The White Buffalo is a 1977 western film adapted from a novel of the same name, starring Charles Bronson as Wild Bill Hickok and Will Sampson as Crazy Horse, who hunt a rampaging white buffalo that haunts Hickok's dreams and killed Crazy Horse's child.
- Red Dead Redemption 2 has a legendary animal quest where the player can hunt a white bison.
- Canadian rock music duo Crown Lands made a song called "White Buffalo" as the third song in a trilogy about indigenous rights. The song appears in their EP White Buffalo, released on September 16, 2021.
- In season 3 of the Netflix television series The Umbrella Academy, a white buffalo is mounted on the wall of the "white buffalo-suite" in Hotel Oblivion, through which a gate to another dimension that allows for a universe reset can be accessed. This alternate dimension mirrors our own, since there, the rear of the buffalo is mounted on the wall instead. Later in the season it is said on a newscast that ancient people believed the universe rests on the horns of a white buffalo.
- In Stephen Graham Jones's 2025 historical horror novel The Buffalo Hunter Hunter, a rare white buffalo calf named Weasel Plume is rescued and protected in a hidden sanctuary by the protagonist, Good Stab. Named after Good Stab's childhood moniker, the white buffalo serves as a sacred symbol of hope and a representation of the natural world and Blackfeet heritage that he fights to preserve from commercial hunters.

== See also ==
- White Buffalo Calf Woman
- White Buffalo Cow Society
