= Dawn Martin-Hill =

Canadian professor in Indigenous Studies

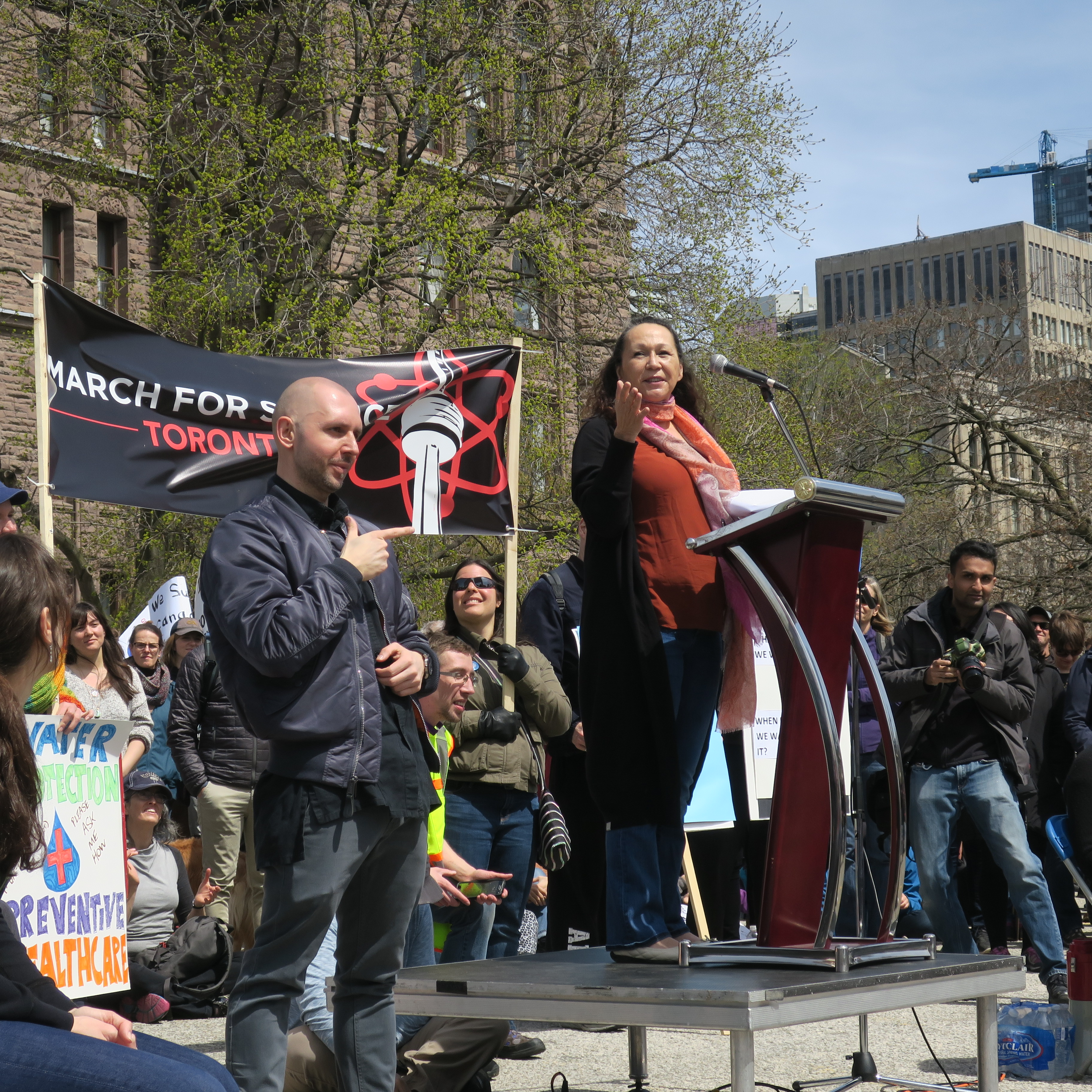
- Martin-Hill speaking at the Toronto March for Science in April 2017
- Citizenship: Canada
- Education: PhD (1995) McMaster University, Cultural Anthropology
- Occupations: Associate Professor, Anthropology & Indigenous Studies
- Employer: McMaster University
- Children: Cody Looking Horse
- Family: Wolf Clan
- Honours: Paul R. MacPherson Chair in Indigenous Studies, McMaster University

Professor Dawn Martin-Hill (Mohawk, Wolf Clan) holds the Paul R. MacPherson Chair in Indigenous Studies (appointed in 2013) at McMaster University, Hamilton, Ontario, Canada. Martin-Hill is an associate professor with appointments in the Department of Anthropology and the Indigenous Studies Program. She co-founded the Indigenous Studies Program while she was a student in the 1990s.

== Research ==
Martin-Hill does research in the area of social-cultural anthropology. Her research focuses on indigenous knowledge and cultural conservation, including language preservation, cultural reclamation and aboriginal spirituality.

Martin-Hill also works on Indigenous women's issues and aboriginal health, including traditional medicine. Her academic work examines Indigenous traditionalism and decolonization, and she has produced several documentary films. She has examined water security, including the lack of access to clean water at her home community, Six Nations of the Grand River.

== Documentary films ==
Martin-Hill has produced several documentaries. The first, "Jidwá:doh - Let’s Become Again" (2005), examines Elders’ understandings of historical trauma and directions for beginning to heal collectively, using Indigenous knowledge and traditional practices. This film was based on an Elder's Summit that Martin-Hill organized, which was attended by over 600 elders and youth from across the Americas.

"Onkwánisteńhsera - Mothers of our Nations" (2006), examines the need for Indigenous women to reclaim, restore and revitalize their traditional knowledge.

The documentary, “Sewatokwa'tshera't: The Dish with One Spoon” (2008), is about the Haudenosaunee reclamation of traditional lands, including the 2006 Caledonia land claims dispute.

== Scholarly outreach and public engagement ==
Martin-Hill actively engages in public outreach, and advocacy for First Nations rights, particularly in areas of access to health and health policy. She brings both Indigenous and higher education academic perspectives to the table. She is frequently interviewed by regional, national and international media on topics ranging from the lack of access to clean water (water security) in First Nations communities to the next steps that should be taken following the release of the Final Report of the Missing and Murdered Indigenous Women's and Girls Inquiry.

In April 2017, she spoke at the Toronto March for Science and in May 2017, she was a plenary speaker at the Researcher's Summit Meeting in Toronto, organized in response to Canada's Fundamental Science Review.

== Personal life ==
Martin-Hill's son is Indigenous youth activist, Cody Looking Horse, who protested at Standing Rock in 2016 against the Dakota Access Pipeline project. Looking Horse is a representative of the Standing Rock Youth Council. She also has a daughter, Makasa Looking Horse, with Chief Arvol Looking Horse.

== Awards ==
- US-Canada Fulbright award
- Outstanding Teaching Award from the Aboriginal Institutes Consortium

== Selected publications ==
Indigenous Knowledge and Power and The Lubicon Lake Nation, University of Toronto Press, 2007
