= John Mooar =

John Wesley Mooar was, along with his brother Josiah Wright Mooar one of the major buffalo (bison) hunters in the United States prior to the animal's near extinction in 1883. The brothers had the foresight to invest their hunting profits in other ventures at the height of the profitable period, so by 1879 they had left the hunting fields, with John Wesley running a cattle ranch purchased with their proceeds.
