= J. Wright Mooar =

American bison hunter

J. Wright Mooar (born August 10, 1851, in Vermont, d. May 1, 1940 in Snyder, Texas) was an American buffalo (bison) hunter. By the age of twenty, Mooar was hunting buffalo in Kansas, first for meat, and later for hides which he sent to his brother John Mooar in New York. John later quit his job and joined J. Wright in Kansas, forming a partnership in 1872.

Mooar is known for having killed a rare white buffalo at Deep Creek, Scurry County in 1876, as his crew was on a hunting expedition from Fort Griffin.

J. Wright and John later became cattle ranchers, ranching in Scurry County and Mitchell County, Texas until 1905.

== Sources ==
- Scurry County Historical Commission
