= Wildlife Prairie Park =

Animal and nature park in Illinois, U.S.

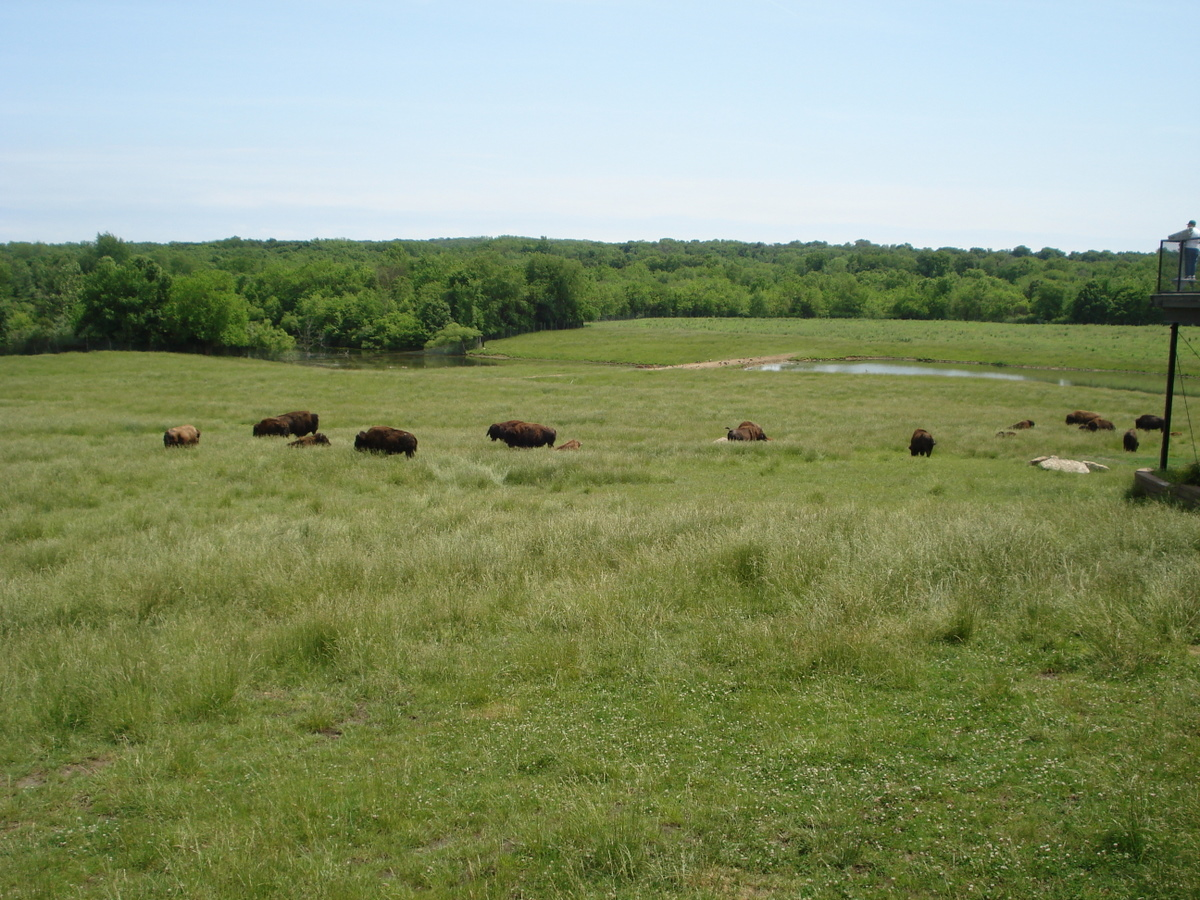
- Bison and rolling prairie near observation deck

- Location within Illinois Location within Peoria County, Illinois Location within the United States
- Location: Peoria County, Illinois
- Nearest city: Norwood, Illinois
- Coordinates: 40°44′N 89°44′W
- Area: 1,700 acres (6.9 km^{2})
- Owner: Friends of Wildlife Prairie Park
- Website: wildlifeprairiepark.org

Wildlife Prairie Park, also known as the Hazel & Bill Rutherford Wildlife Prairie Park, is located in Peoria County, Illinois, approximately 10 miles (16 km) west of downtown Peoria in central Illinois. Opened in the 1970s, it has most recently been operated as a not-for-profit corporation since 2013. The park has 1,800 acres (730 ha) of land with over 150 animals of 60 different species that are native to Illinois.

== History ==
Local philanthropist and attorney Bill Rutherford Sr. and his wife Hazel founded Wildlife Prairie Park. The Forest Park Foundation first acquired the area in the late 1960s. The foundation had originally intended to use the land as a breeding farm for endangered species in partnership with the Brookfield Zoo and the Chicago Zoological Society. However, the zoo's plans changed. The Forest Park Foundation pivoted to create a zoological park that would preserve the native plants and animals of Illinois.

Wildlife Prairie Park initially welcomed visitors in September 1977 for six weeks in honor of Hazel Rutherford's birthday. The park officially opened to the public on August 4, 1978.

On September 5, 2000, Bill Rutherford Sr. presented the deed to the park to Governor George Ryan and the park was transferred from private foundation ownership to the Illinois Department of Natural Resources and renamed Hazel & Bill Rutherford Wildlife Prairie State Park. Although owned by the state, the Forest Park Foundation continued to manage the park operations under a contract with the Illinois Department of Natural Resources.

Wildlife Prairie Park struggled to receive funding from the state. The Forest Park Foundation agreed to turn over operational responsibility to a new governing board, a group of locals known as Friends of Wildlife Prairie Park.

In May 2013, the park was officially transferred back into private ownership when it was given to the Friends of Wildlife Prairie Park. The land was officially reclaimed in 2014.

== Flora and fauna ==
Some of the wildlife includes white bison, wolves, waterfowl, black bears, elk, otters, badgers, snakes, bobcats, butterflies, and other native animals.

== Recreation ==
Fishing, riding the train, camping, hiking, biking, kayaking, and other activities are available in the park.

The Prairie Zephyr Train is a one-third scale train with over a mile of track. There are two locomotives, a "steam" locomotive powered by a Caterpillar Diesel engine, and a "diesel" locomotive powered by a Chevy Cobalt gasoline engine. The train has two freight cars and nine passenger cars. Five of these passenger cars were built by Chance Rides out of Wichita, Kansas and were previously used at the St. Louis Zoo. Four passenger cars were built by Sandley Light Railway Equipment Works of Wisconsin Dells, Wisconsin, and were acquired from the Milwaukee County Zoo. The train offers rides to guests during fair weather.

Many of the park's artificial elements were constructed by hand and with recycled materials in an effort to reduce their negative environmental effects years before it was commonplace to safeguard the environment. The bricks on the visitor center patio and train depot, the repurposed whiskey barrels as trash cans, the resawn wood used in the buildings, and the numerous telephone poles used in the gates and bridges around the park are all made of recycled materials. The habitats and bridges are largely hand-built. This practice has extended to on-site lodging, where guests can stay overnight in converted Santa Fe Train Cabooses and former grain bins. On-site accommodation includes contemporary cabins with porches facing the bison and elk pastures, one-room log cottages, and patios facing Caboose Lake.

== Photo gallery ==
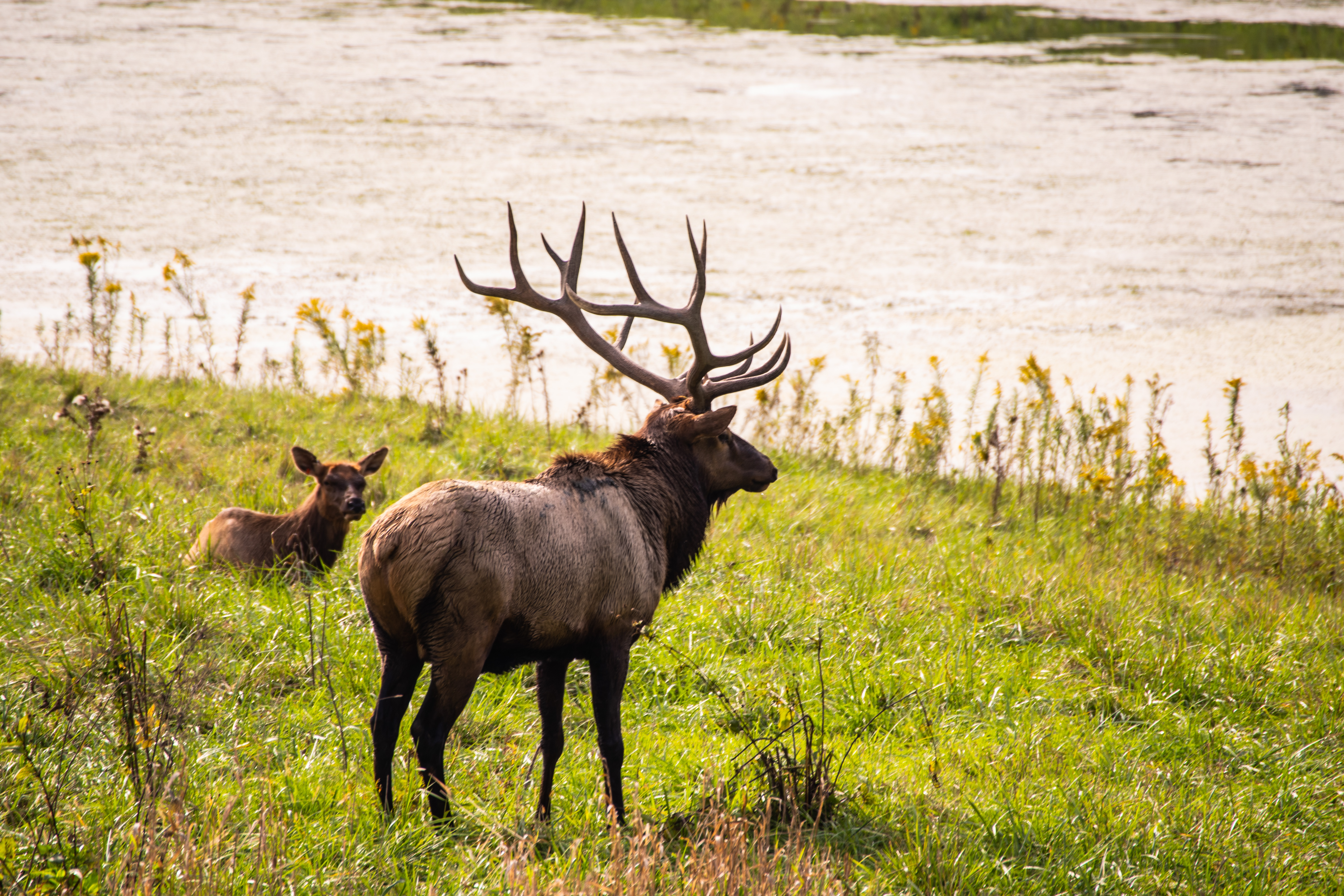
Ernest the Elk

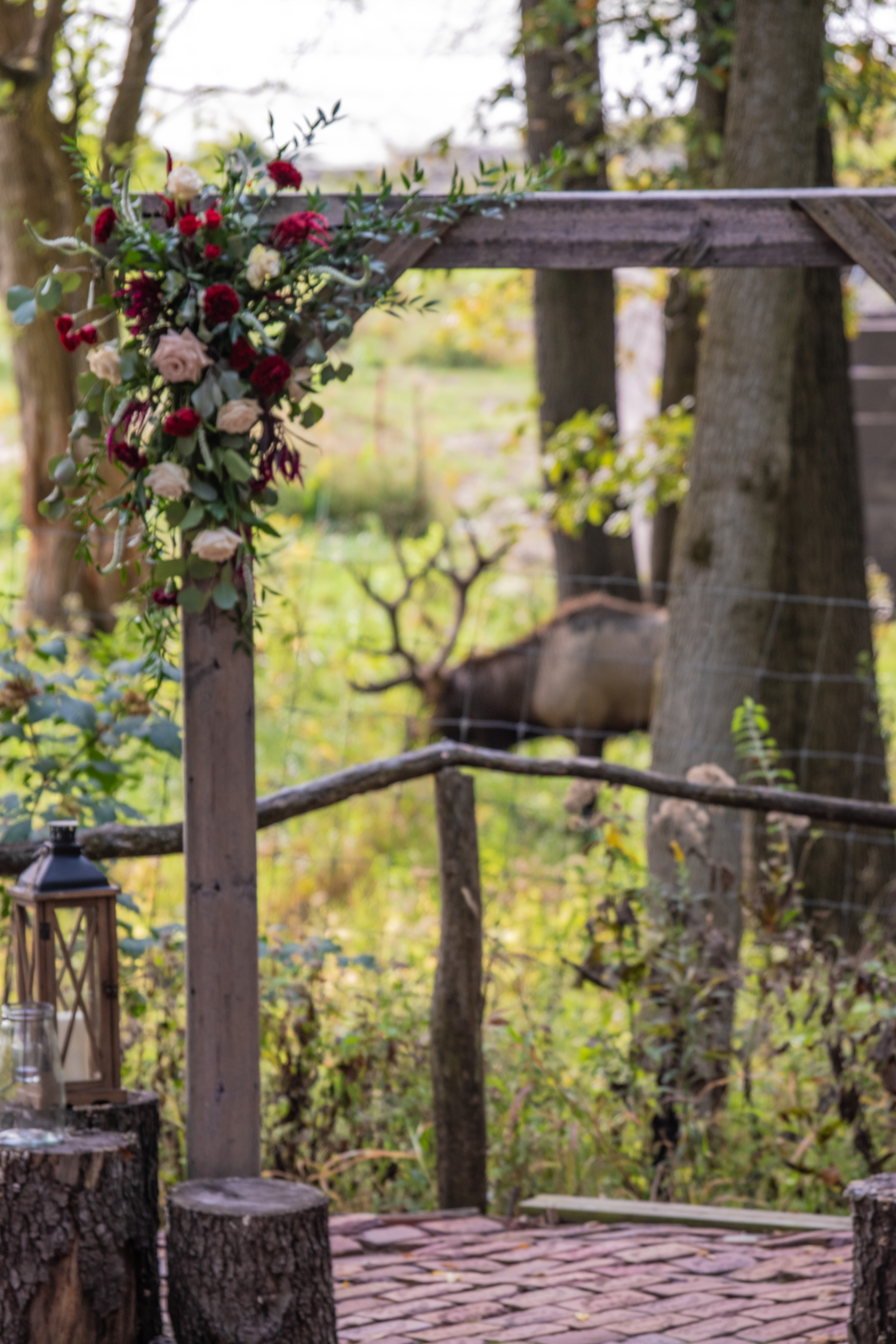
Ernest at the Vista Bricks ceremony site

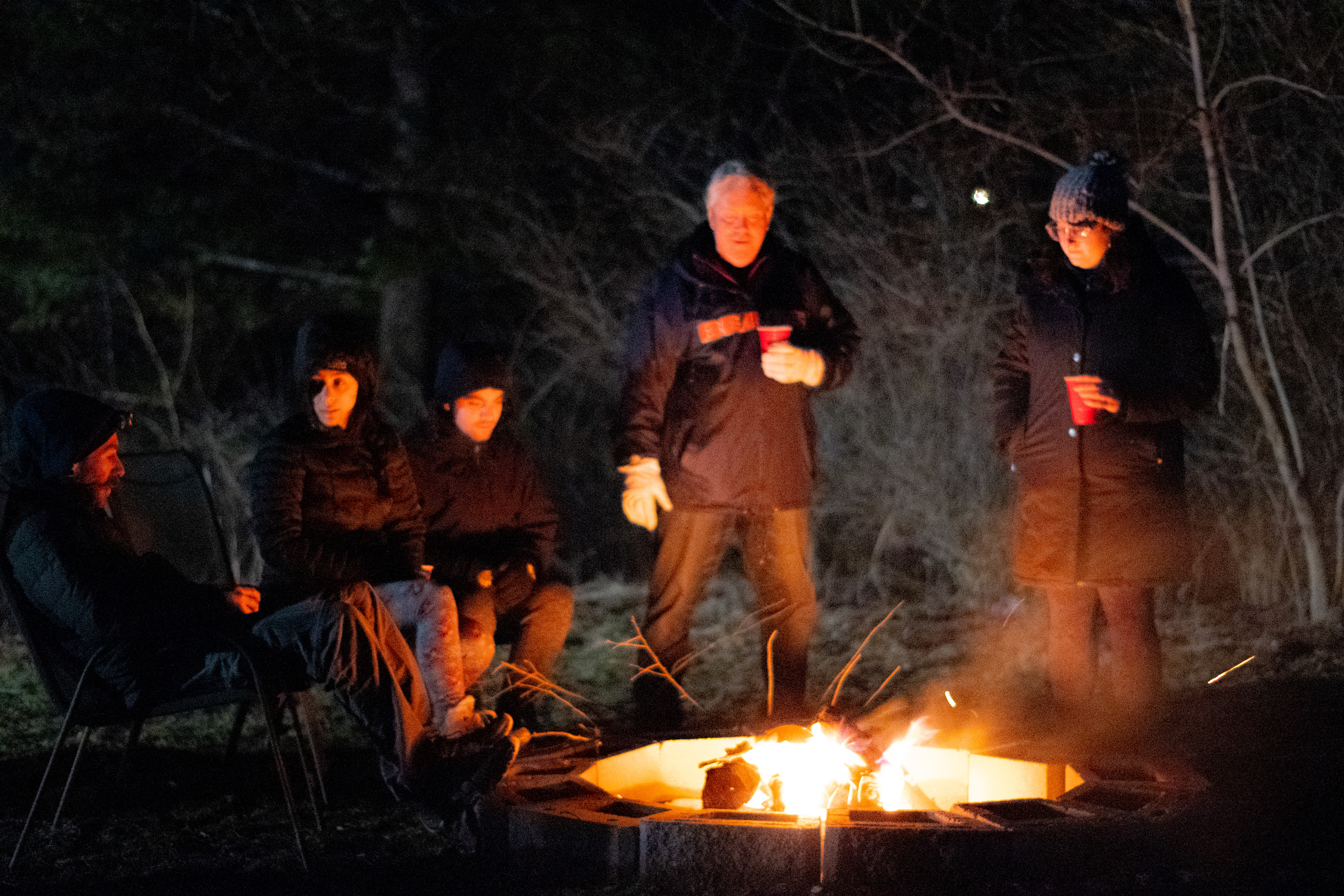
Campfire at night

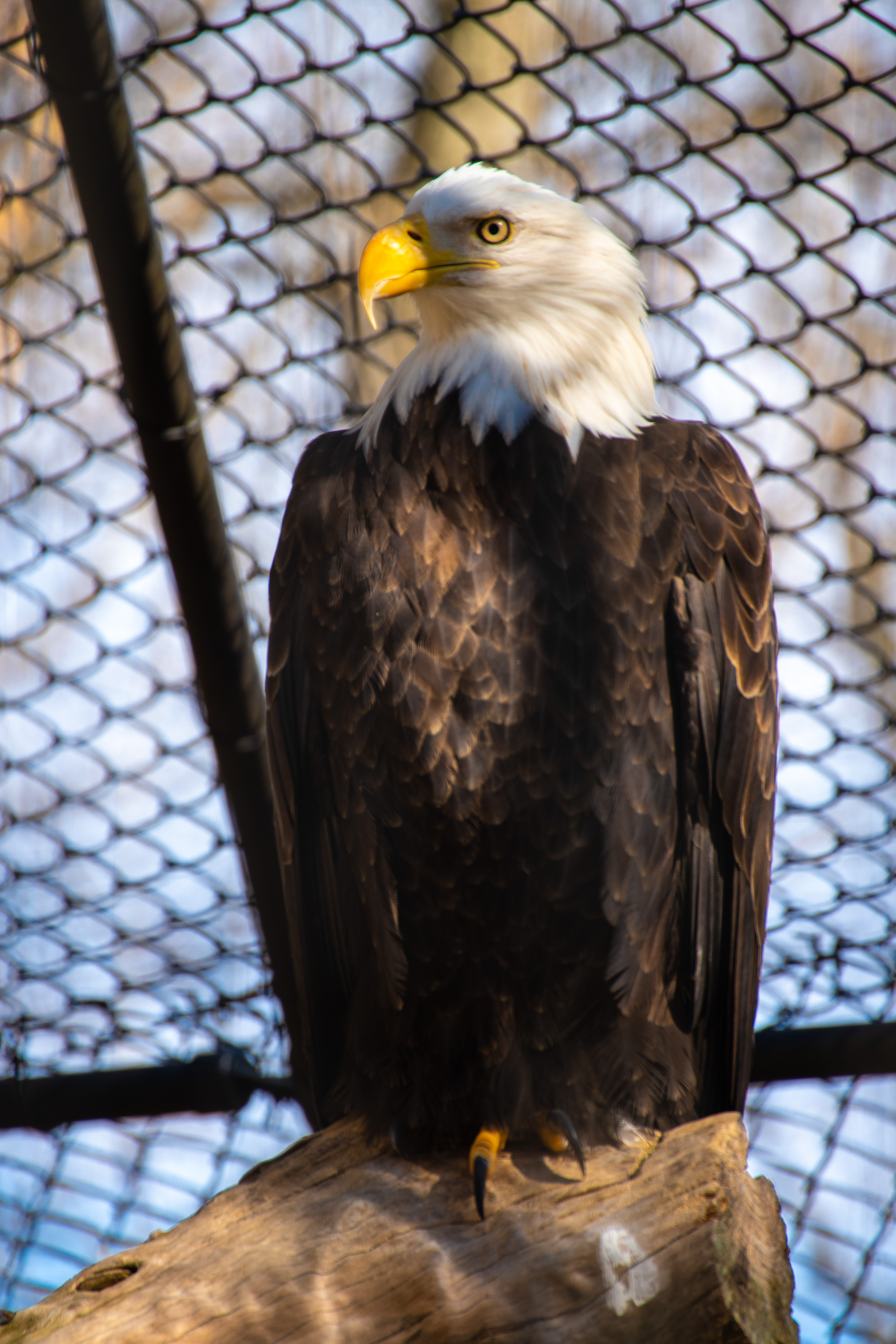
Eagle

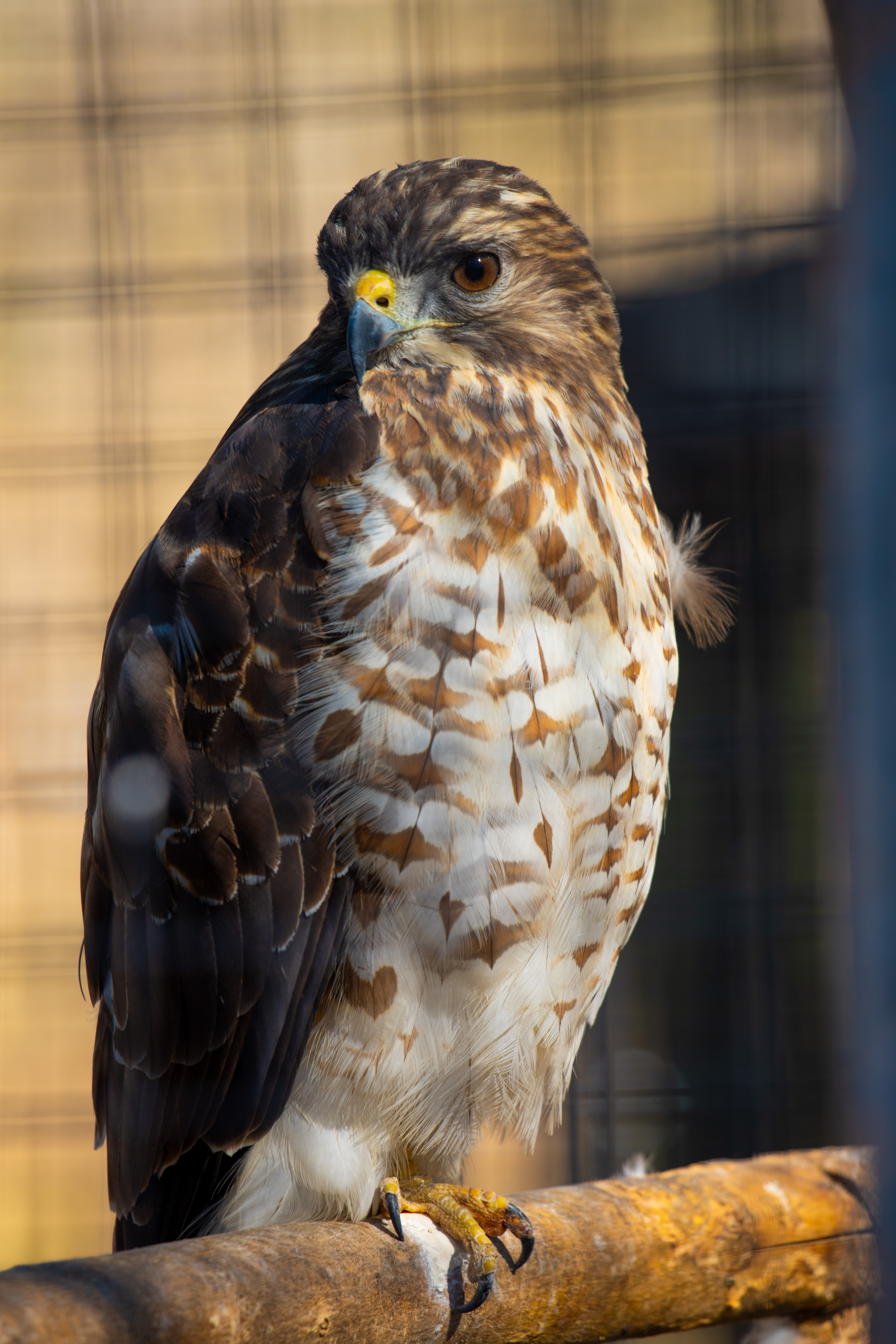
Hawk

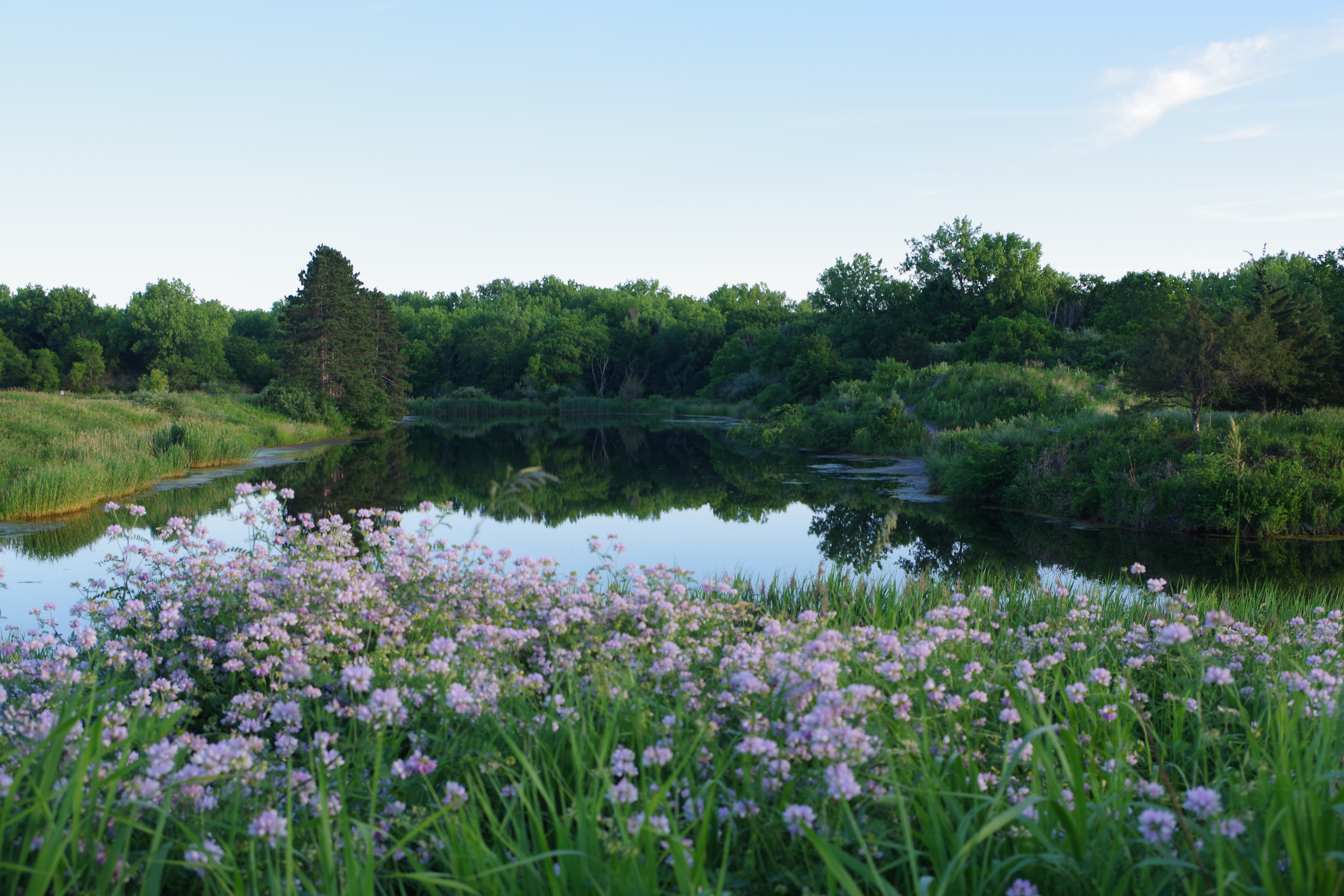
Fishing area on the "west side" section
