= Temple of Understanding =

Interfaith organization in New York City

The Temple of Understanding is an interfaith organization in New York City founded in 1960 by Juliet Hollister.

== History ==
In its early years, the organization convened large "Spiritual Summits" in Calcutta (1968) and Geneva (1970) bringing together religious and spiritual leaders of diverse traditions to engage in dialogue, and address problems of intolerance, injustice and religious persecution. This network was supported by a distinguished group of “Founding Friends” including Eleanor Roosevelt, U Thant, Pope John XXIII, and the XIVth Dalai Lama, among others. These gatherings included Spiritual Summit V (1975), the first interfaith conference held at the United Nations and the first time a woman, Mother Teresa, represented the Catholic Church. The TOU has maintained a strong presence at the United Nations, attending global conferences, organizing workshops, lectures and major events including hosting the 50th Anniversary Celebration of the UN in New York (1995).

By 2008 the Temple of Understanding had become a leading organization in the interfaith movement.

== Mission ==
The Temple of Understanding states that its mission is to achieve peaceful coexistence among individuals, communities and societies through interfaith education, with programs that emphasize experiential knowledge and dialogue as a means of connecting people across a spectrum of religious communities to create a more just and peaceful world. Its stated goals are to:

- foster appreciation of religious and cultural diversity
- expand public discourse on religion and spirituality
- promote constructive social change
- further education for global citizenship

The Temple of Understanding is a 501(c) (3) non-profit and Non-Governmental Organization with Consultative Status at the United Nation (ECOSOC).

== The United Nations ==
In 1960, the TOU was encouraged by Eleanor Roosevelt to become an NGO and embrace Article 18 of the Universal Declaration of Human Rights, protecting freedom of thought, conscience and religion. In 2000 the Millennium Declaration, signed by 189 member states, identified 8 Millennium Development Goals (MDG) to be achieved by the year 2015. The TOU's representative to the United Nations interweaves these goals throughout the organization's programs at the UN, in addition to sponsoring conferences and workshops on religious freedom.

== The Juliet Hollister Awards ==
In 1996 the Temple of Understanding established the Juliet Hollister Awards Ceremony, named in honor of its founder. Awards are granted to people who are either religious figures who bring interfaith values into the place of worship where the faithful congregate and secular figures who promote greater understanding of spiritual values in areas such as the arts, education, media, government, science, social justice, law and ecology.

Past awardees include: Queen Noor, James Parks Morton, Sri Swami Satchidananda, Maestro Ravi Shankar, Henry Luce III, Mary Robinson, the XIVth Dalai Lama, Nelson Mandela, Dr. Wangari Maathai, Peter Max, Dr. Thomas Berry, Dr. Coleman Barks, Dr Suheil Bushrui, Cokie and Steven Roberts, Dr. Hans Kung, Pir Vilayat Inayat Khan, Suzan Johnson Cook, Thomas Keating, Majora Carter, Dr. Karan Singh, Chief Arvol Looking Horse, Venerable Dr. Yifa, and Daniel Pearl (accepted by Dr. Judea Pearl), Karen Armstrong, Prince El Hassan bin Talal, Bartholomew, Desmond M. Tutu, Rev. Dr. James A. Forbes, May Rihani, Rabbi Awraham Soetendorp, NYU Center for Spiritual Life Development Team (Chelsea Clinton, Imam Khalid Latif, and Rabbi Yehuda Sarna).

== The Interfaith Dialogue, Education, and Action (IDEA) ==
The Interfaith Dialogue, Education and Action Program (IDEA) is an education and leadership skills development program for 14- to 19-year-old students.

The stated mission of IDEA is to empower and educate young people from 14 to 19 years old from different cultural backgrounds to build leadership and critical thinking skills, create strong bonds of friendship across ethnic, cultural and religious groups and enter into lifelong learning. The hope is to provide underserved youth with the tools to break the cycle of poverty.

== The Interfaith Experience ==
In the fall of 2007, the TOU launched "The Interfaith Experience," a program at the Rubin Museum of Art which presented artists, thinkers and leaders who provided their insights on the role of faith in the creative and intellectual process. Presenters for the series included actor Linus Roache, the Venerable Nicholas Vreeland, visionary artist Alex Grey, Revs. Alan Lokos and Susanna Weiss, Ezgi Sorman, Dr Kurt Johnson, Loch Kelly and the Rev. Masud Ibn Syedullah, TSSF.
