= Mahpiya Ska =

Albino buffalo

Mahpiya Ska (Sioux language) or White Cloud (July 10, 1996 – November 14, 2016) was an albino female bison primarily residing at the National Buffalo Museum located in Jamestown, North Dakota. She was on loan to the museum and the project caring for her was funded by the City of Jamestown for approximately $10,000 per year. She was certified a true Albino American bison. She died November 14, 2016, at her birthplace herd that she had been returned to, Shirek Buffalo Ranch.

White Cloud, like most albino buffalo, was almost totally deaf and had limited vision and joined the herd located at the museum in 1997. She gave birth to several calves, although none of them were pure white. Native Americans from all over America performed sacred pilgrimages to visit her. She was allowed to roam freely within a several hundred acre expanse of the museum grounds. The fence outside of her compound in Jamestown was tied with hundreds of prayer and ribbon bundles from Native Americans who traveled thousands of miles to offer prayers and receive blessings.

According to Buffalo Tales, the newsletter of the North Dakota Buffalo Foundation and the National Buffalo Museum, White Cloud had a white calf on August 31, 2007. According to the newsletter and the museum's website this was White Cloud's first white calf. Museum officials determined that the calf was a male, but it would not be named until January 2008. The museum solicited suggestions from the public for a name for the calf until November 30, 2007. Finally, the name Dakota Miracle was decided on. While Dakota Miracle is white, he is not albino like his mother.

White Cloud was born on July 10, 1996, on the Shirek Buffalo Farm in Michigan, North Dakota. She was DNA tested for albino genes and cattle genes before she went to the National Buffalo Museum in Jamestown, North Dakota in May 1997. The results of those tests indicated that she was pure albino and also pure bison (commonly known as buffalo). It is not known for sure whether or not White Cloud's white calf is also a true albino. The white calf was produced when White Cloud mated with her first male calf, a normally brown-colored bison.

== See also ==
- Kenahkihinén
