= Arvol Looking Horse =

Lakota spiritual leader

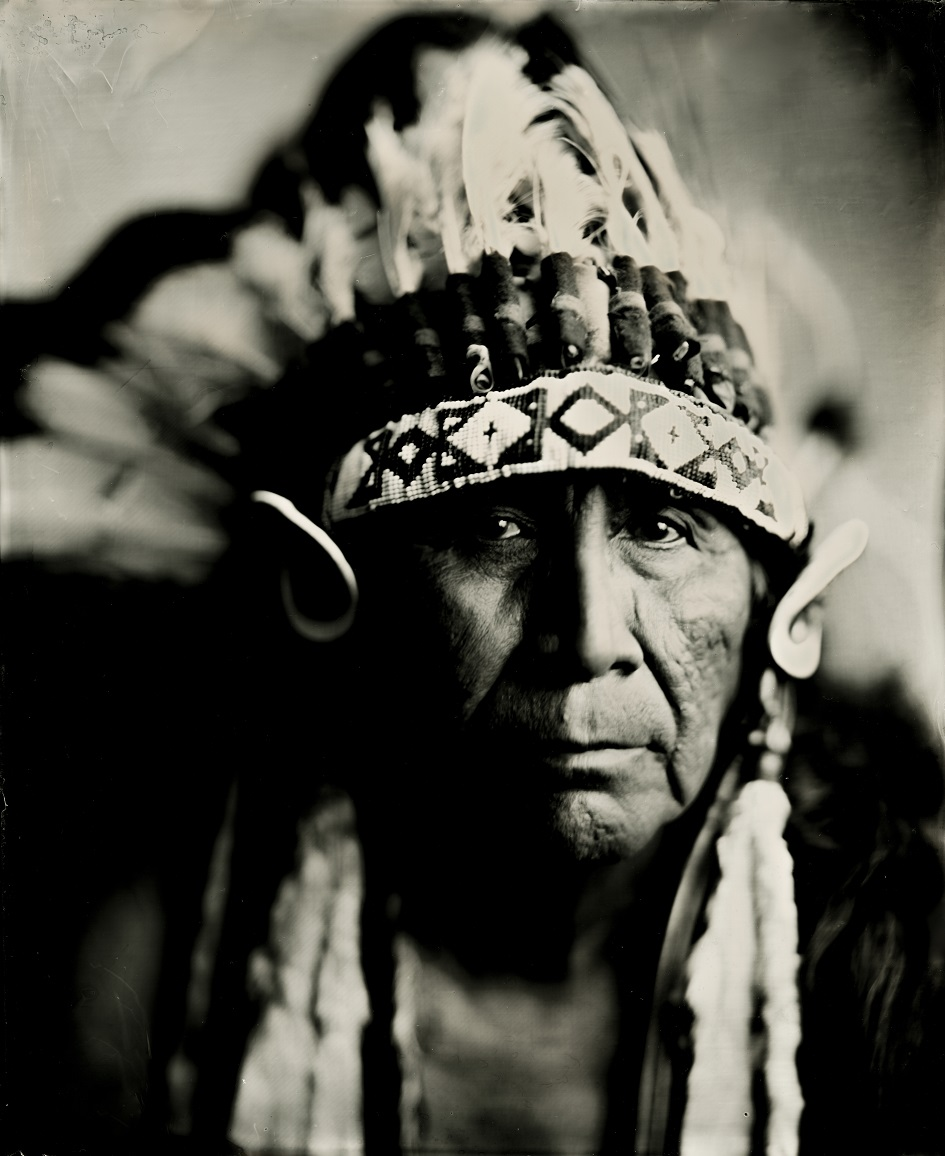
Arvol Looking Horse

Arvol Looking Horse (born 1954) is a Lakota Native American spiritual leader. He is the 19th keeper of the Sacred White Buffalo Calf Pipe and Bundle.

He is a leading voice in the protest against the construction of the Dakota Access Pipeline (DAPL).

== History ==
=== Early life and career ===
Arvol Looking Horse was born in 1954 on the Cheyenne River Indian Reservation in South Dakota to Cécilia Looking Horse, a Hunkpapa tribe member, and Stanley Looking Horse, a member of the Mni Sa band of the Itazipco tribe of the Titonwan Lakota people. Growing up in a traditional Lakota family and community, he was immersed in the culture and spirituality. He learned to speak Lakota as his first language, only later learning, and becoming fluent in, English.

The Looking Horse family are the keepers of the White Buffalo Calf Pipe, which Lakota tradition teaches was gifted to the Oceti Sakowin by White Buffalo Calf Woman. At twelve years old, Arvol Looking Horse inherited the White Buffalo Calf Pipe and the role of Keeper, becoming a ceremonial leader of the Lakota, Dakota and Nakota Peoples. He is the current Keeper in a line that goes back for 19 generations. In the 400 year tradition of guardians of the sacred pipe, Looking Horse was the youngest to be entrusted with this responsibility. His grandmother had warned him that if the world did not improve during his lifetime, it was likely that he would be the last of the sacred bundle keepers. While attending a government boarding school he witnessed the suppression of the spiritual traditions of his people, which led to his decision to work for religious freedom, and the preservation and protection of his culture.

Due to his parents being involved in horseback riding and rodeos, Looking Horse himself practiced as a professional rodeo rider as an adult until an accident when a horse fell on him. He became paralyzed and quadriplegic from the injury, along with having both kneecaps shattered. Over time, he eventually regained the ability to walk, despite a poor outlook from his doctors.

=== Big Foot Memorial Ride ===
Since 1986, Looking Horse has led a group on the Big Foot Memorial Ride, which retraces the final journey of Chief Big Foot known as Chief Spotted Elk or Unphan Gleska in Lakota (erroneously renamed “Chief Big Foot” by a US Army soldier at Fort Bennett) and his band before they were killed in the Wounded Knee Massacre in 1890. The ride takes place from December 15 to 29. The usually severe winter temperatures connect the riders with the hardship Big Foot and his band faced before their deaths. Another ceremony titled "Mending The Sacred Hoop" was conducted by Looking Horse in 1990 for the surviving family members from the Wounded Knee Massacre.

=== Other activities ===
Looking Horse has conducted prayers and speeches in support of climate change action and against projects such as the Dakota Access Pipeline at the UN General Assembly and at the 1997 inauguration of President Bill Clinton. He attended the March for Science in Washington, D.C., to push for climate change response.

Due to a prophecy stating that the Seventh Generation of the Native American community would be the ones to restore the community, elders of the tribes and the Seven Council Fires have come out in support of the International Indigenous Youth Council and Looking Horse gave the youths involved at the Dakota Access Pipeline a Čhaŋnúŋpa and they were officially recognized as "warriors for the people" known as akicita.

In 1994, a rare white buffalo calf was born and Looking Horse traveled to many sacred sites to perform the Four Direction ceremony in honor of the calf. To further promote this birth, Looking Horse created the World Peace and Prayer Day in 1996 for people of all faiths to support world peace and environmentalism. Subsequent ceremonies for World Peace Day were held in Canada in 1997, Minnesota in 1998, Costa Rica in 1999, and the final ceremony in the Lakota region of South Dakota in 2000. With this, Looking Horse felt he had completed the ceremonial purpose of honoring the four directions and finishing in the center, meaning his part of the day was done and he turned over future organization of it to the broader international community. Another set of five ceremonies was performed around the world from 2001 to 2005, before it was suggested to the UN in 2005 to make the day into an officially recognized "Honoring Sacred Sites Day". To help keep the ceremony organized and funded, Looking Horse and other Indigenous elders formed the Wolakota Foundation in Eagle Butte, South Dakota, to help promote the spiritual traditions of indigenous peoples around the world.

On May 10, 2003, during the Bear Butte Protection of Ceremonies meeting, Looking Horse made a Proclamation that non-Indians would not be allowed to attend Lakota ceremonies, due to ongoing exploitation and appropriation of Native American spiritual practices.

== Awards and honors ==
He received The Wolf Award of Canada in 1996, given to a person who has dedicated his life to working for peace. He has also received The United Nations Juliet Hollister Temple of Understanding Award in 2006. In 1996 the city of New Orleans honored Chief Looking Horse by proclaiming August 27 "Day of the White Bison", and by the donation of the key to the city by the mayor. In 2017, the Malibu Guitar Festival presented him with a humanitarian award.

== Personal life ==
Looking Horse's son, Cody Looking Horse, is a member of the Standing Rock Youth Council and was active in the Dakota Access Pipeline protests; his mother is Professor Dawn Martin-Hill (Haudenosaunee).

== Bibliography ==
- Looking Horse, Arvol; Arden, Harvey; Horn, Paula (2001). White Buffalo Teachings from Chief Arvol Looking Horse, 19th Generation Keeper of the Sacred White Buffalo Pipe of the Lakota, Dakota & Nakota Great Sioux Nation. Dreamkeepers Press. 2nd edition, published by HYT Publishing
