= Jackson Zoo =

Zoo in Jackson, Mississippi, United States

Jackson Zoological Park
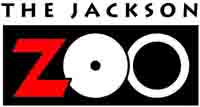
- Interactive map of Jackson Zoological Park
- 32.3202°N 90.2207°W
- Date opened: 1919; 107 years ago
- Location: Jackson, Mississippi, United States
- No. of animals: 250
- No. of species: 120
- Annual visitors: 120,000
- Memberships: Zoological Association of America
- Major exhibits: African Rainforest, African Savannah, Asian Garden, Wilderness Mississippi
- Website: www.thejacksonzoo.org

The Jackson Zoo is a zoo that was established in 1919 in Jackson, Mississippi and exhibits over 120 species and approximately 250 individual animals, providing the public the opportunity to observe and study wildlife from around the world and region. The Jackson Zoo is in the historic 110-acre (0.45 km^{2}) Livingston Park and welcomes approximately 85,000 visitors annually from Mississippi and surrounding states. 20,000 school children make their way to the zoo throughout the school year.

The Jackson Zoo is the second largest zoo in the state, behind the 175-acre (0.71 km^{2}) Tupelo Buffalo Park and Zoo, and was the only zoo accredited by the Zoological Association of America (ZAA) in the state. The zoo has been struggling with attendance and funding.

== History of the Jackson Zoo ==
In 1916, the city of Jackson purchased from Samuel Livingston 79 acres (320,000 m^{2}) of undeveloped land, then on the outskirts of town. By 1919, a group of firefighters were collecting various animals, housing them in the central fire station, what is now the Chamber of Commerce Building.

In 1921, after the collection had evolved from rabbits and squirrels to include exotics like zebras, the city decided to move them to the newly purchased land and the Livingston Park Zoo was created.

In the 1930s, many new buildings were erected with help from the Works Progress Administration (WPA) during the Great Depression. The City of Jackson, like almost every other city and state, used funds from the New Deal programs to create construction jobs for its citizens in those hard times. With the public works, the City and zoo director Irl Bennett left a heritage of facilities that have served Jackson for some 80 years. Today, many of the buildings constructed by the WPA are still standing. At the time, the Castle served as Monkey Island, housing several dozen rhesus macaques and the Elephant House Café was home to a young Asian elephant. The grounds also served as a park to its visitors, with much of the zoo's land remaining open, a scenic location with a lake.

In 1948, the collection was expanded thanks to the efforts of Jacob L. Reddix, President of Jackson State College. With his help, the zoo was able to purchase several rain forest specimens from the government of Liberia, including three chimpanzees, three rare mangabey monkeys, a colobus monkey, a lemur, and two pythons.

In 1962, three African American residents of Jackson sued the City of Jackson for de facto segregation of the city's recreational facilities, including the city's zoo, golf courses, pools, and parks. Even though a three judge panel concluded that the arrest of an African American "boy and girl" at Livingston Park was an "isolated publicity stunt," the court did not agree with the city's argument in favor of "voluntary segregation" and supported the racial integration of all of Jackson's recreational facilities, including Jackson Zoo. Soon thereafter, instead of allowing for a seamless integration of the Jackson's recreational facilities, Mayor Thompson ordered all of the city's public pools and bathrooms closed, while also removing benches and picnic tables from public parks, including the Jackson Zoo.

In the 1970s, the children's petting zoo was added, later renovated to what is now the Discovery Zoo. An animal hospital was built to perform routine checkups, for surgeries for any of the residents, and to quarantine new arrivals before they can live amongst the permanent collection. In 1975, James L. Swigert became the director. With the help of the City Council and a design group, he put together the first Master Plan.

In 1985, taking in more space from Livingston Park allowed for the development of the African Rainforest Exhibit. In 1987, Barbara Barrett Piazza was hired as director. In 1989, accreditation came from the Association of Zoos and Aquariums (now known as the AZA).

In 1995, the state government provided $4 million for improvements to the facilities. In 1998, the city agreed to a $1.5 million match. Including the African savannah and the Mississippi Wilderness Exhibits, it would be the largest capital improvement project in the zoo's history.

In 1996, the zoo became a member of a community organization called ZAPP (Zoo Area Progressive Partnership) in an endeavor to assist with the regeneration of the neighborhoods surrounding the location.

In 2004, the Friends of the Zoo installed a new Endangered Species Carousel. Built with the site in mind, it features zebras, leopards, giraffes, and tigers to ride, instead of the traditional horses. Even an alligator bench was built, with handicapped accessibility.

In 2005, the African Savannah Exhibit opened to the public. Barbara Piazza retired as director; Beth Poff became the fifth.

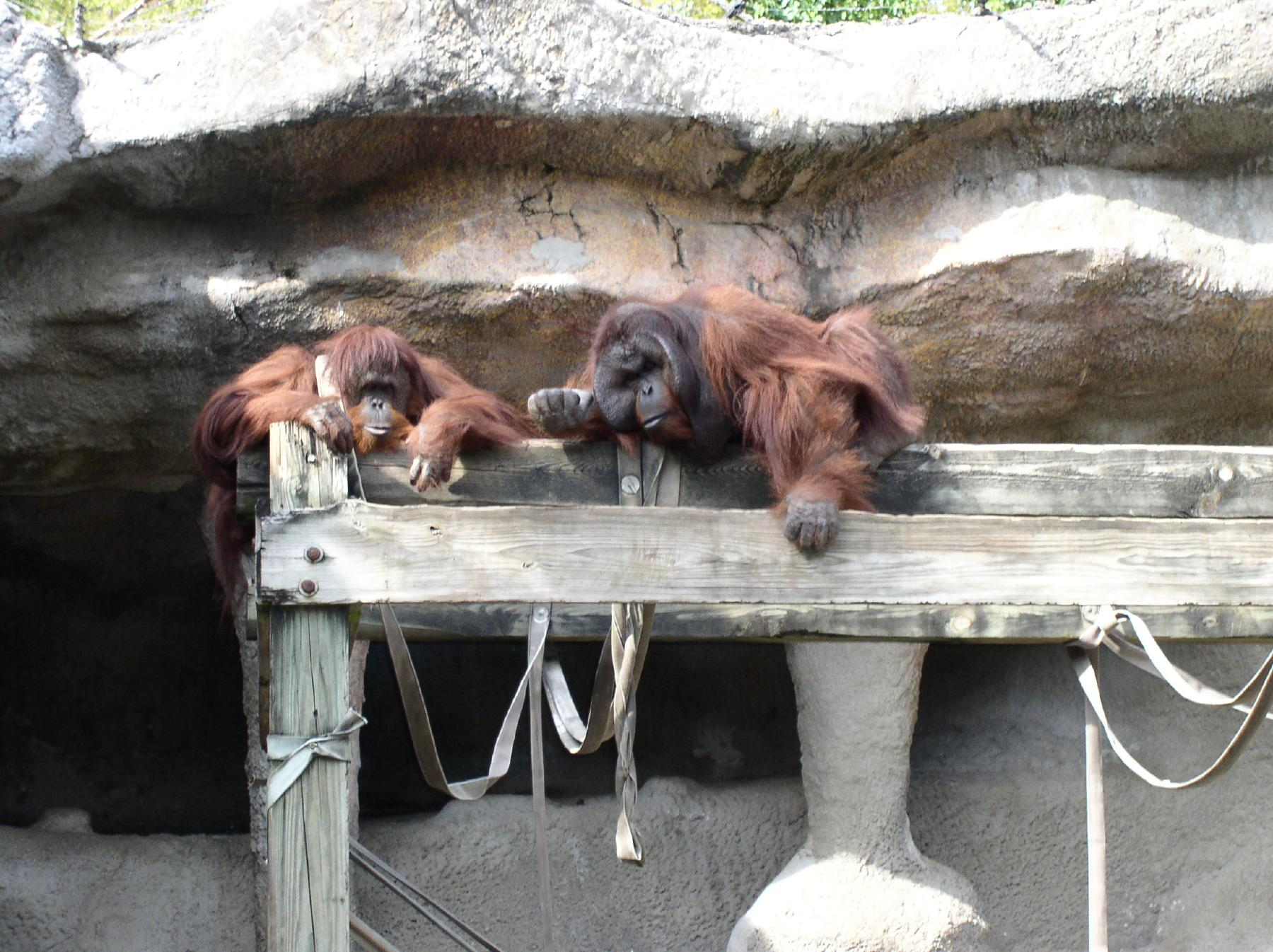
Orangutans exhibit.

In 2006, the Wilderness Mississippi area opened. Renovations were completed to exhibit two orangutans from Borneo. The zoo was named a "Southern Travel Treasure" by AAA Magazine.

In 2007, recognizing the expanded facilities, the Jackson Zoo was named the "Travel Attraction of the Year" presented by the Mississippi Tourism Association; it received the "Attraction of the Year" at the Jackson Convention & Visitors Bureau Summit Awards. Drawings began for Asia exhibit improvements, including a new tiger facility and a water garden.

Also in 2007, a groundbreaking was held for the Gertrude C. Ford Education Center in the Wilderness Mississippi area. In October that year, renovations were completed in the animal hospital, with state funding and donations from Baptist Medical Center.

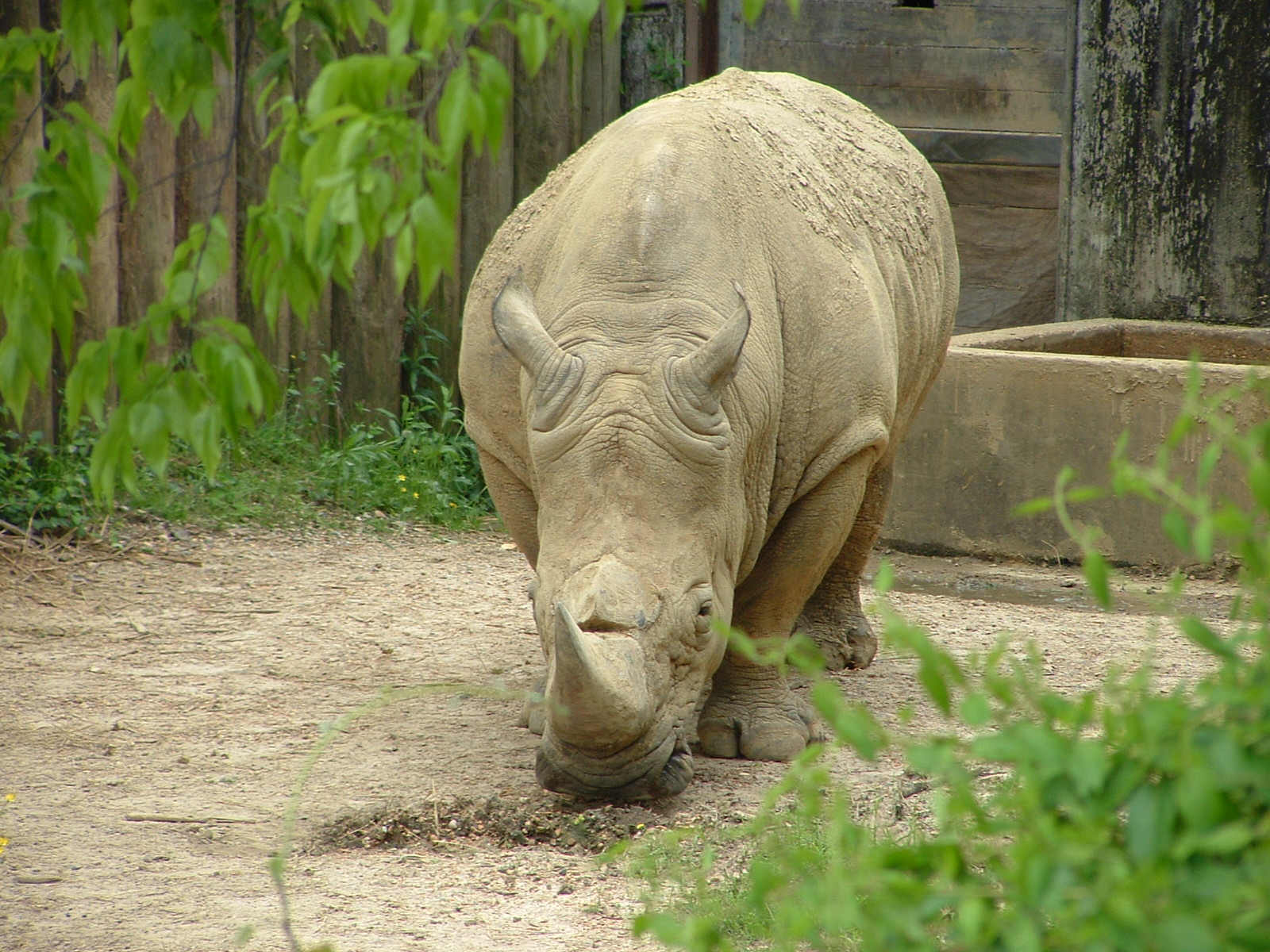
Southern white rhinoceros (Ceratotherium simum simum) at the zoo.

In 2010, the decision was made to send two popular elephant residents to another zoo to form a larger herd, due to lack of acreage and newly discovered species needs. The Southern White rhino becomes the largest mammal in the zoo, and moves to the elephant enclosure.

In 2017, orangutans on loan from other facilities were removed to new properties due to the age of their enclosure and lack of funding to renovate in a timely fashion.

In September 2019, the park closed to the public while re-establishing United States Department of Agriculture Class C licensing. Zoo staff remained in place for animal and facility care under the City of Jackson Department of Parks and Recreation.

As of August 22, 2020, the zoo is open to the public for limited hours on weekends due to COVID-19 restrictions, and awaiting the finalizing of a new management agreement under zoOceanarium LCC with the City of Jackson.

== Exhibits and animal collection ==
The Jackson Zoo currently has approximately 250 animals, representing more than 120 different species from all over the world. There are plans to continue the renovation of any older exhibits that can be used to more modern standards, or new builds to upgrade to current standards of professional animal care. Several buildings have been renovated over the years, and hold certification of historic landmarks with the Mississippi Department of Archives and History: The Elephant House Cafe, the Elephant/Rhino Barn, and the Monkey Castle with its adjoining Ramada. Due to age and safety, neither the cafe nor the castle are home living animals.

The zoo has several areas dedicated to specific places on Earth, including the African Rainforest, African Savannah, Asian Garden, and Wilderness Mississippi.

=== African Rainforest ===
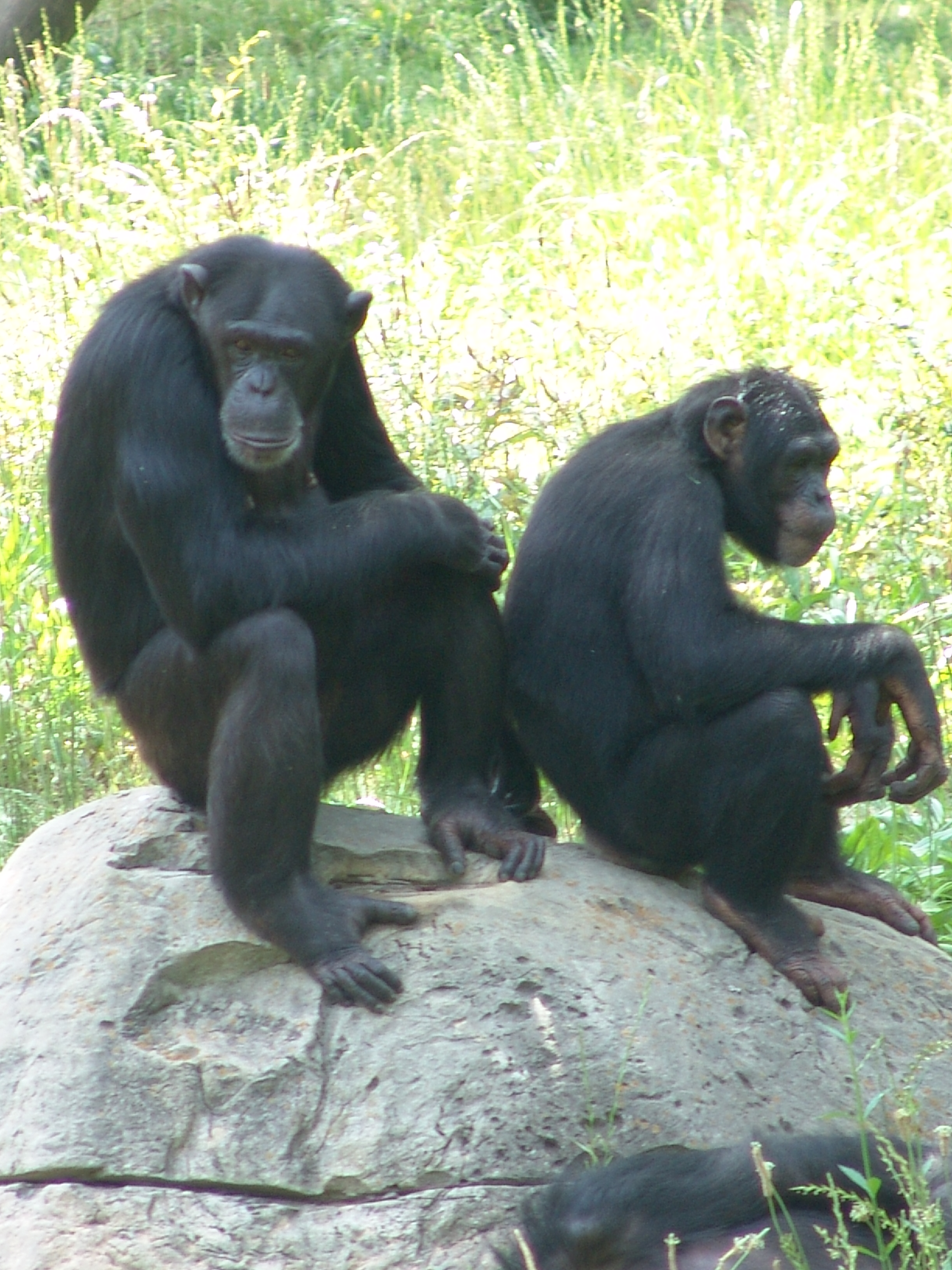
Chimpanzees at Chimpanzee Island.

The African Rainforest is a boardwalk off the main path of the zoo that is designed to submerse visitors into the dense jungle of the forest.

- Pygmy hippopotamus pool - The first exhibit on the African Rainforest is a large lake to the right of the wooden boardwalk. In this lake, with the native red-eared sliders, river cooters, and fish, are three pygmy hippos. Smaller than their larger cousins, the Nile hippopotamus, they typically can be found either in their lake, or wallowing in several of their mud holes in the back portion of the exhibit.
- Chimpanzee Island - The zoo currently has four chimpanzees, all of which live on a large Island in the African Rainforest exhibit. The zoo has one male and four females on property.
- Old World monkey exhibit - this mixed exhibit, with two different species of monkey, Schmidt's guenons and eastern black-and-white colobus, is designed to show visitors mutualism: how many animals coexist within the same environment.
- The rest of the African Rainforest has several exhibits with animals that occupy various niches within the rainforest ecosystem, including Diana monkeys, and red river hogs.

=== African Savannah ===
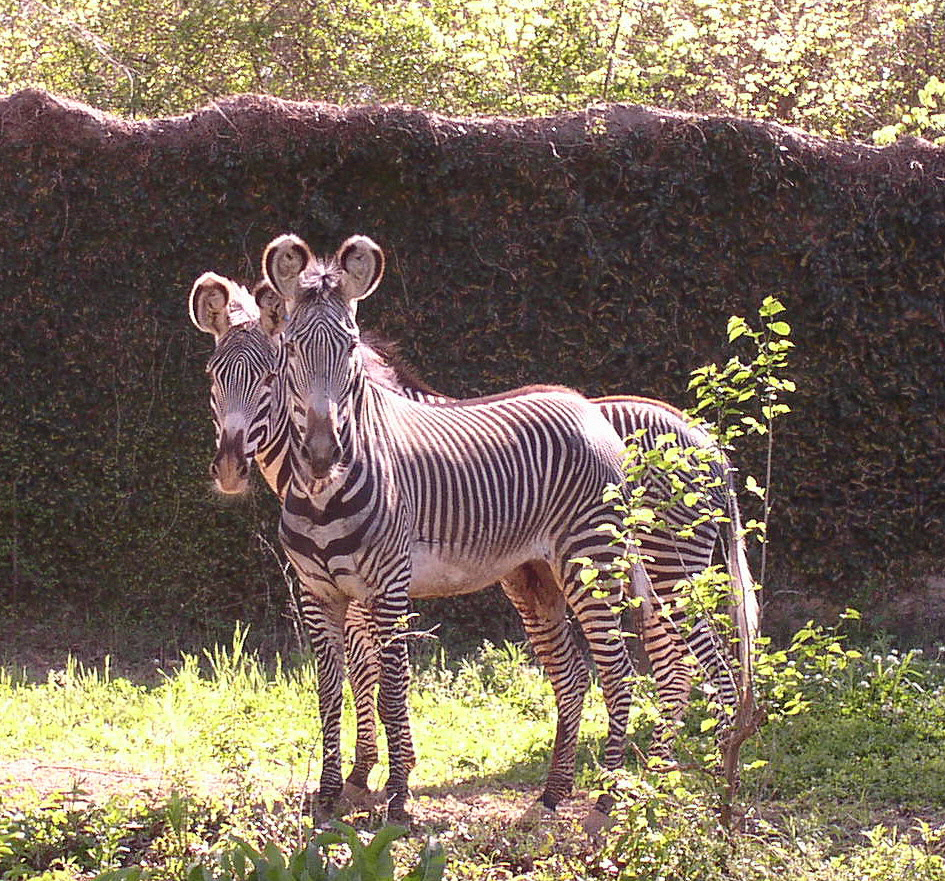
Zebras.

The zoo's African Savannah exhibit is built as two large open plains, separated by fencing and trees. Completed in 2005, these mixed exhibits were designed so that when visitors view its residents, they feel like they are out on a field expedition on the open Savannah.

The Savannah is home to many species of antelope, birds, and even reptiles. The zoo accommodates this by having a large field, with several night houses for the animals to sleep in and several places for the weary animals to hide if need be. Currently, the zoo has several animals calling the African Savannah home, including southern white rhinoceros, sable antelope, Grévy's zebra, klipspringers, wattled cranes, and ostriches.

=== Asian Garden ===
The Asian Garden is right by the entrance and is home to grottos containing Sumatran tigers and Asian black bears. Next to them is the reticulated giraffe habitat, despite not being from Asia. There are also smaller enclosures containing fishing cats and lar gibbons.

=== Wilderness Mississippi ===
In the spring of 2006, the Jackson Zoo opened a section of the zoo dedicated completely to Mississippi's most beautiful creatures. With newly designed exhibits portraying many of the states natural ecosystems, the Jackson Zoo has many of the states most represented animals including American alligators, North American river otters, American beavers, cougars, and rattlesnakes now calling the zoo home.

The first building found on the zoo's new facility is the Backyard Creatures, a venomous snake house.

=== Other animals ===
The other animals in the zoo include black-headed spider monkeys, black-tailed prairie dogs, cotton-top tamarins, red ruffed lemurs, red wolves, American flamingos, laughing kookaburras, black-necked swans and several other birds and reptiles.

== Gallery ==
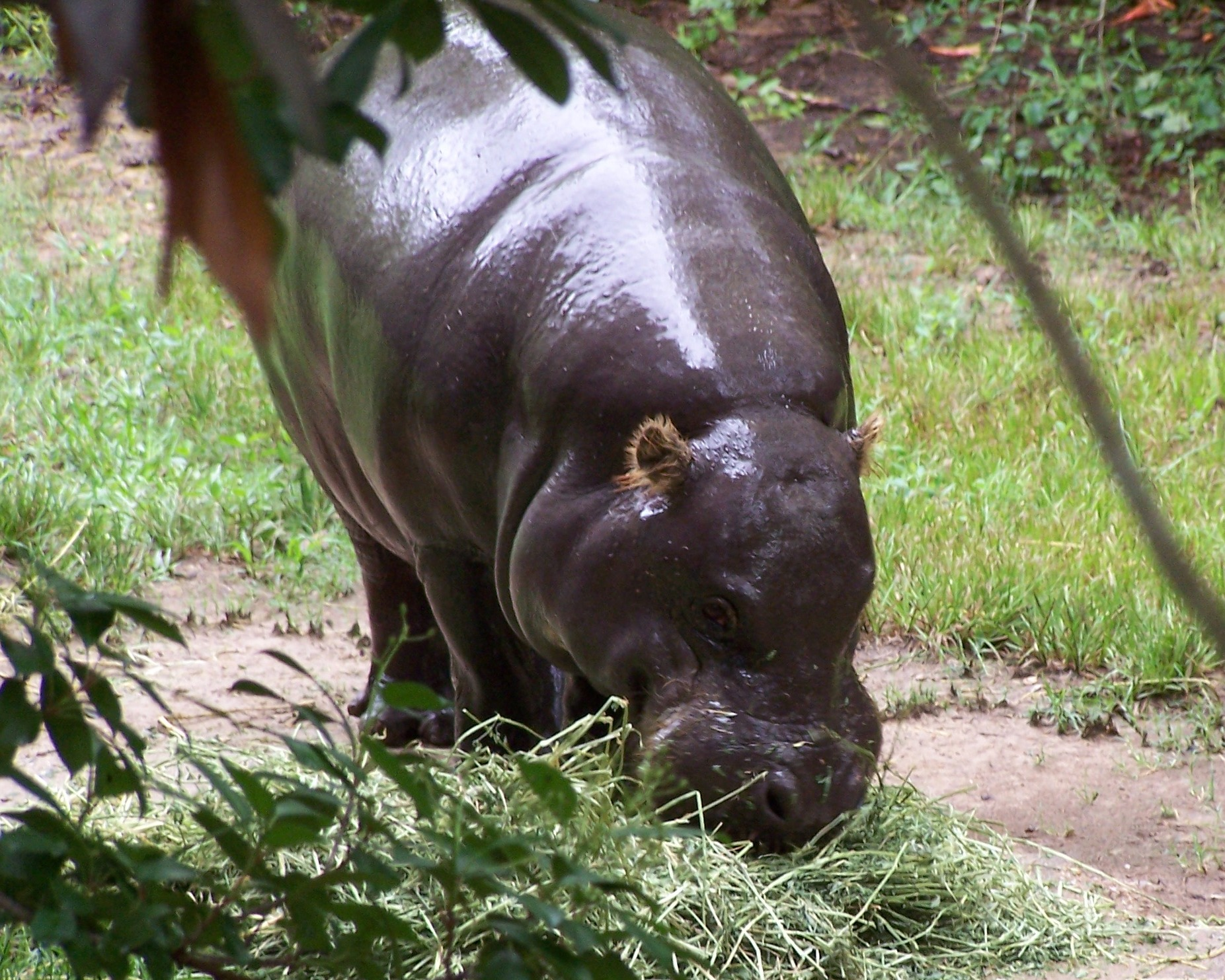
Pygmy Hippopotamus.

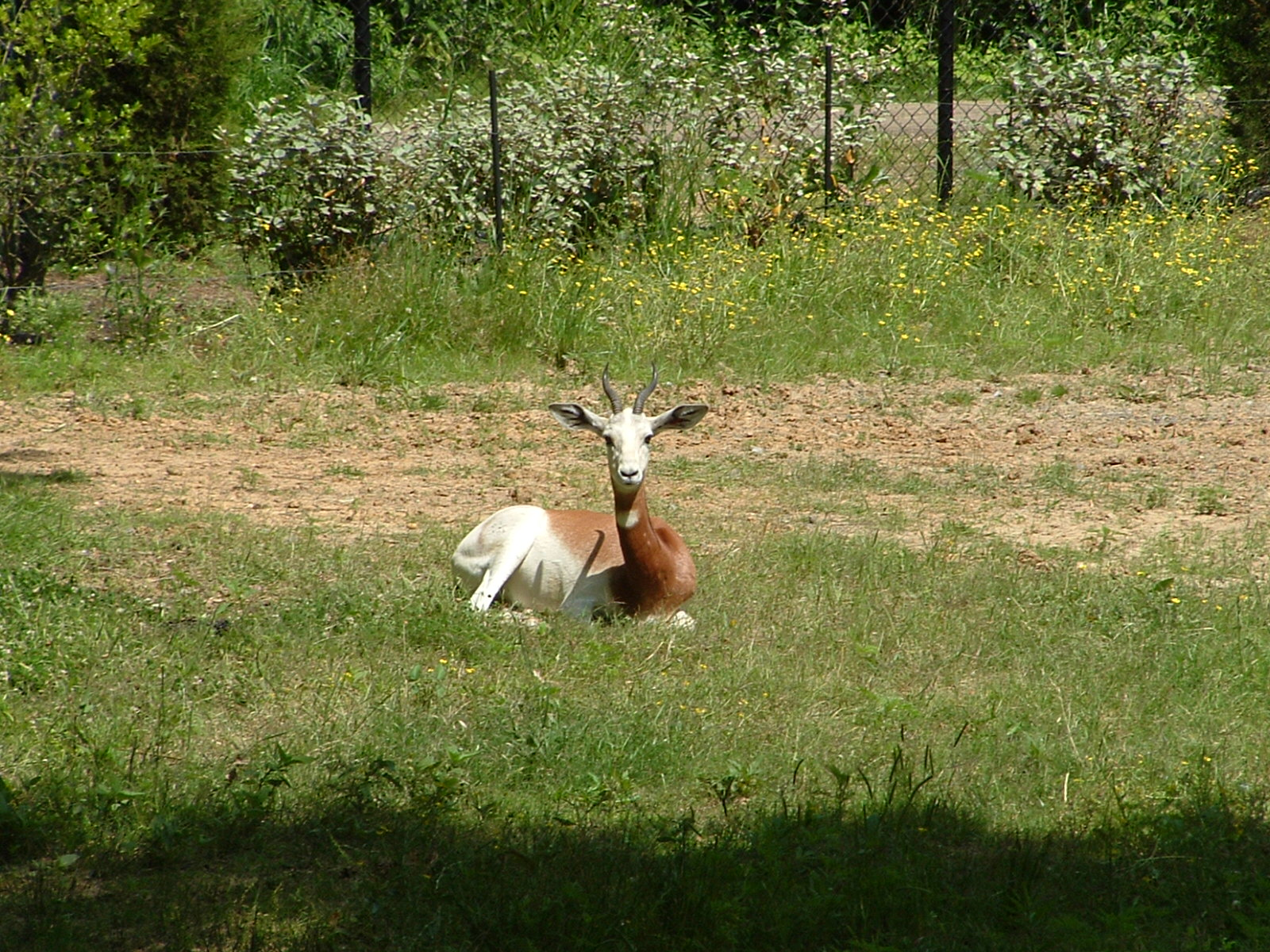
Addra gazelle.

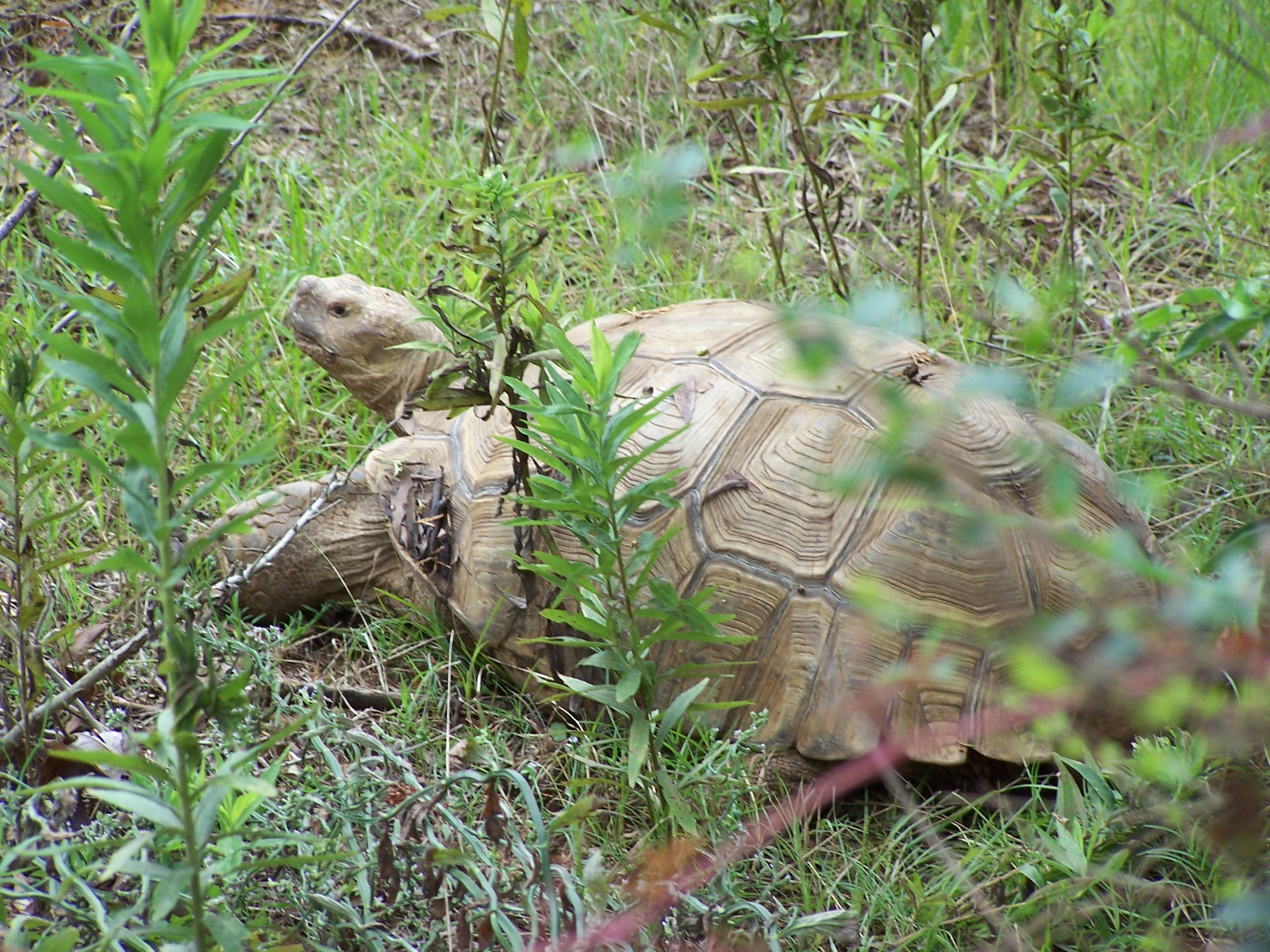
Tortoise.

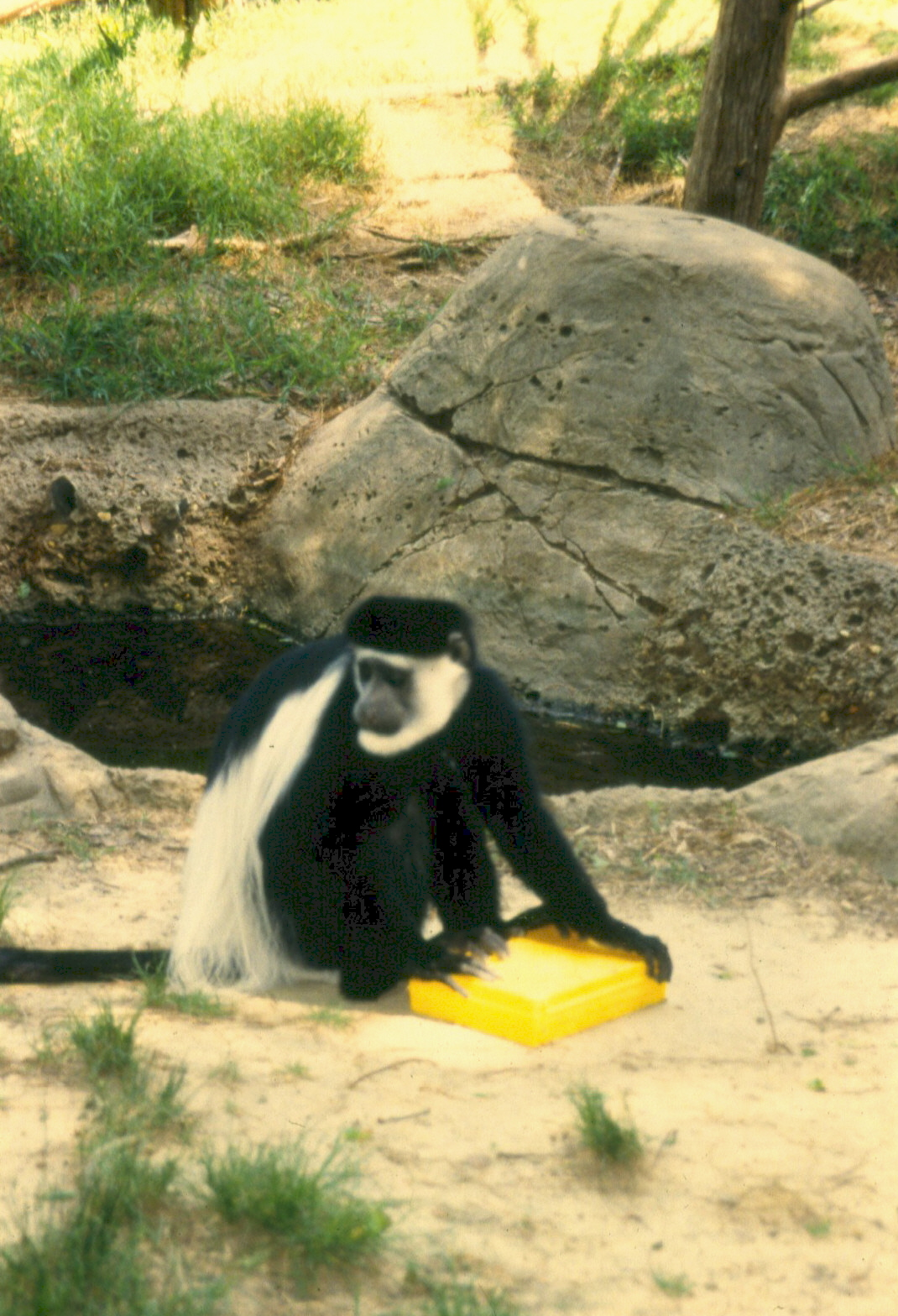
Colobus monkey.

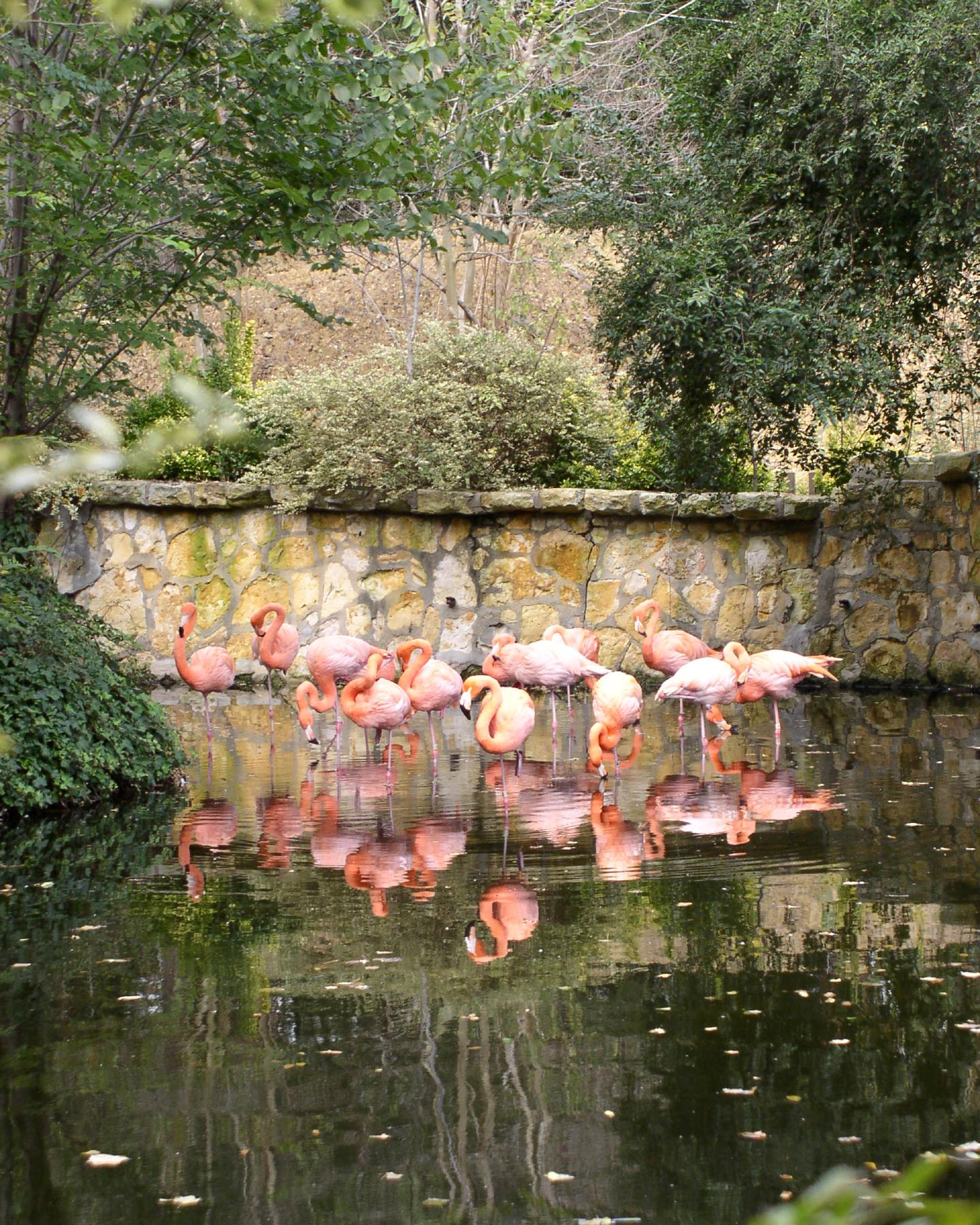
Flamingos at the zoo.

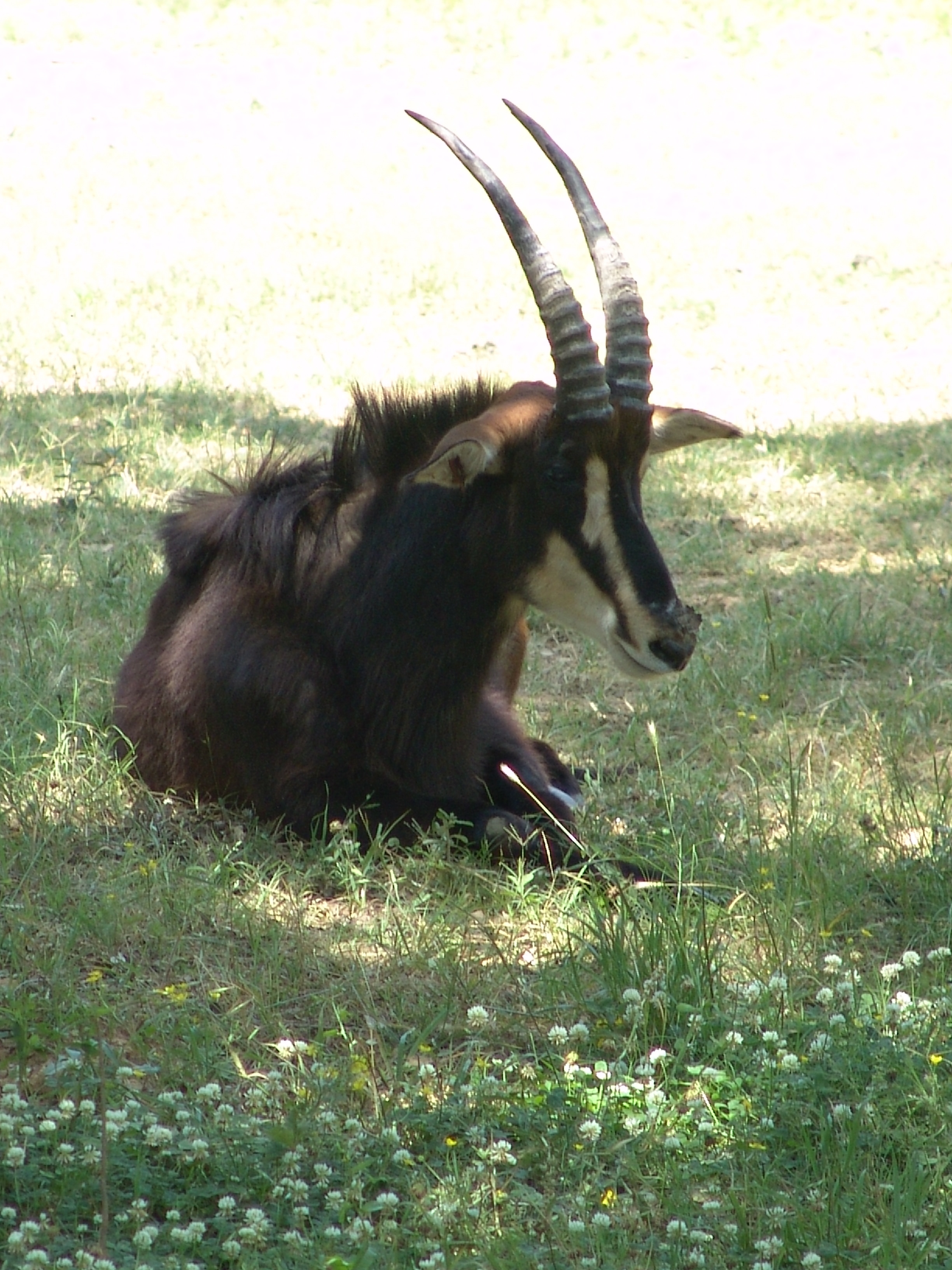
Antelope.

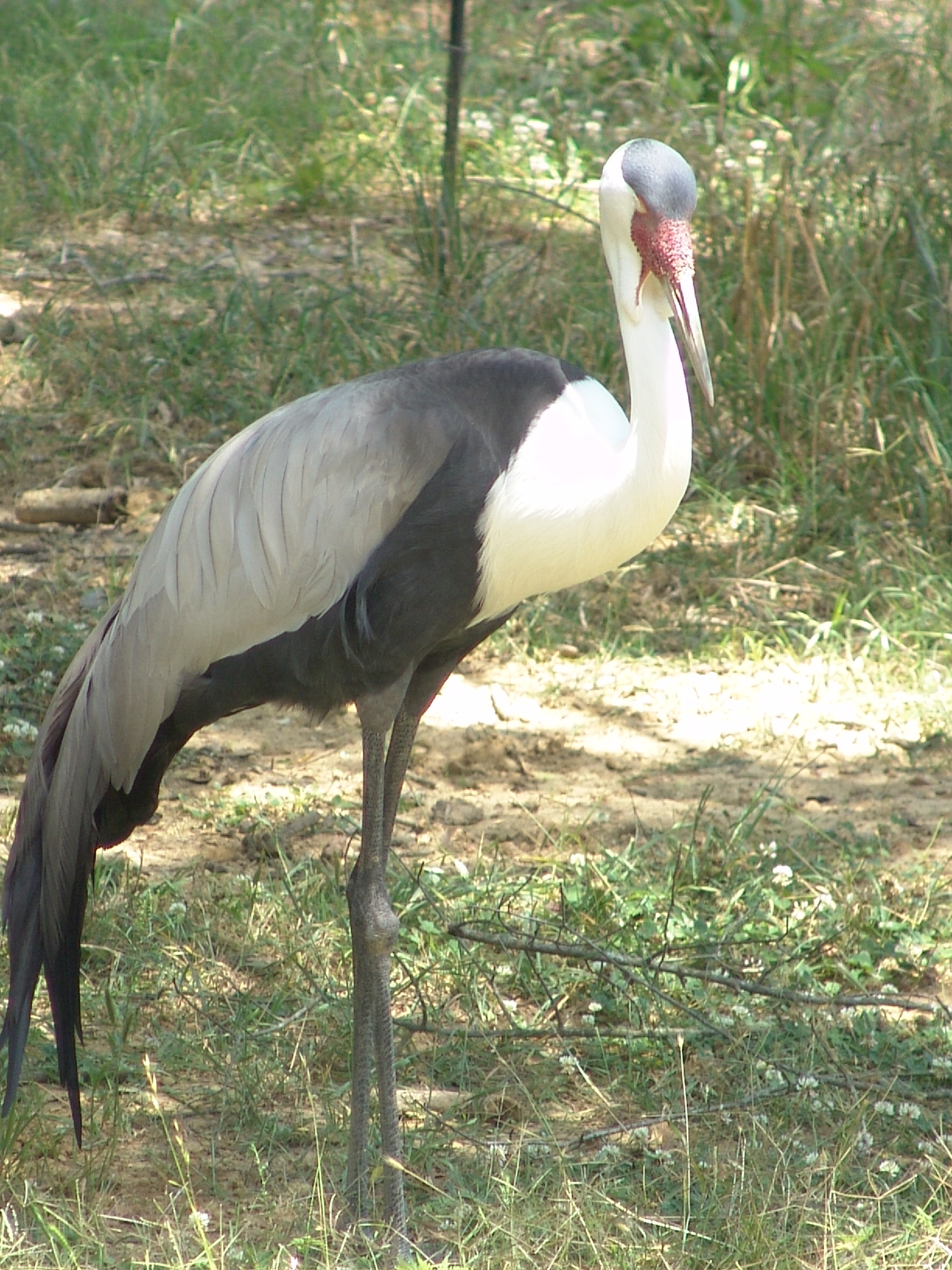
Wattled Crane.

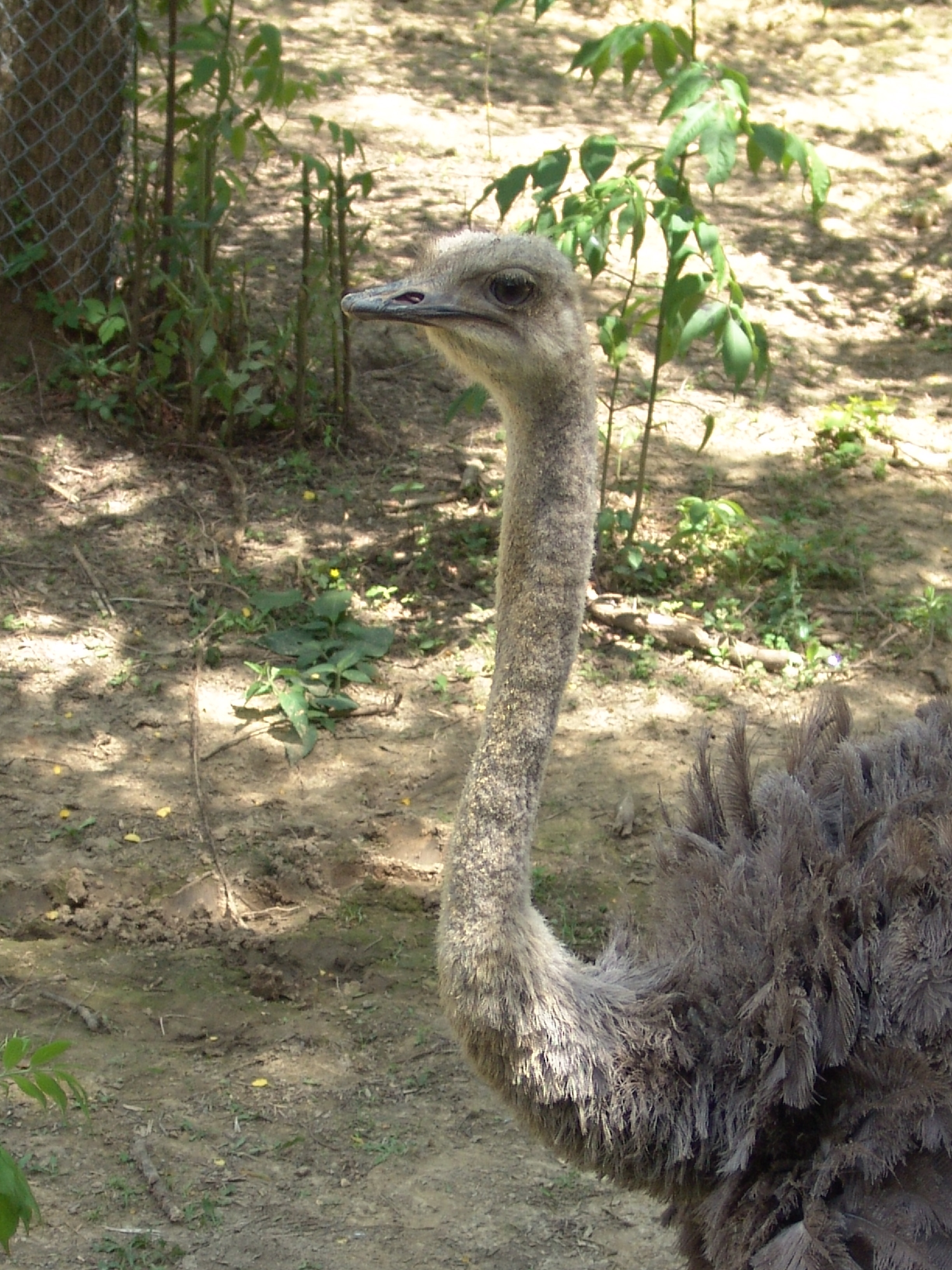
Ostrich.

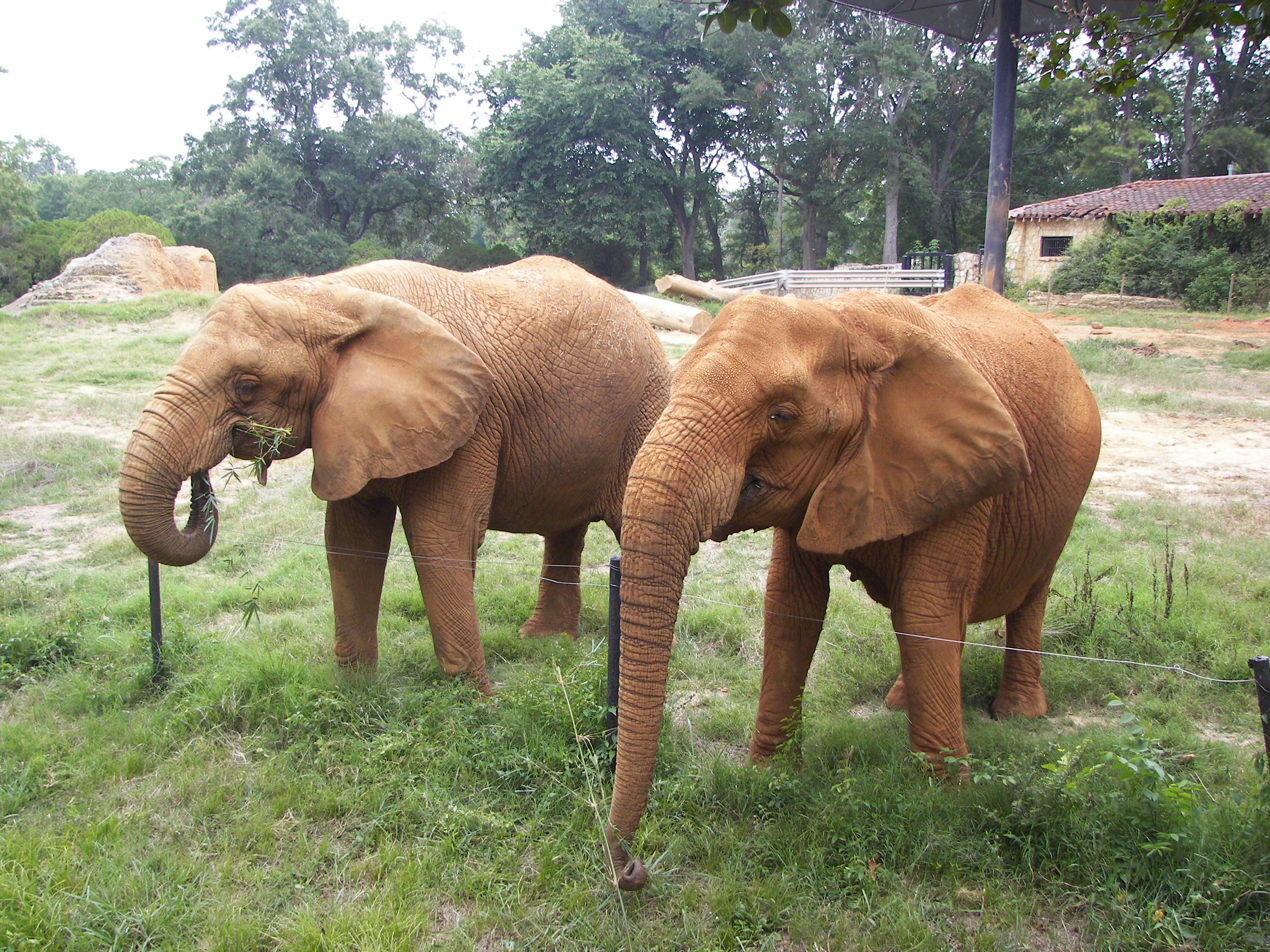
Former African elephants of the zoo.

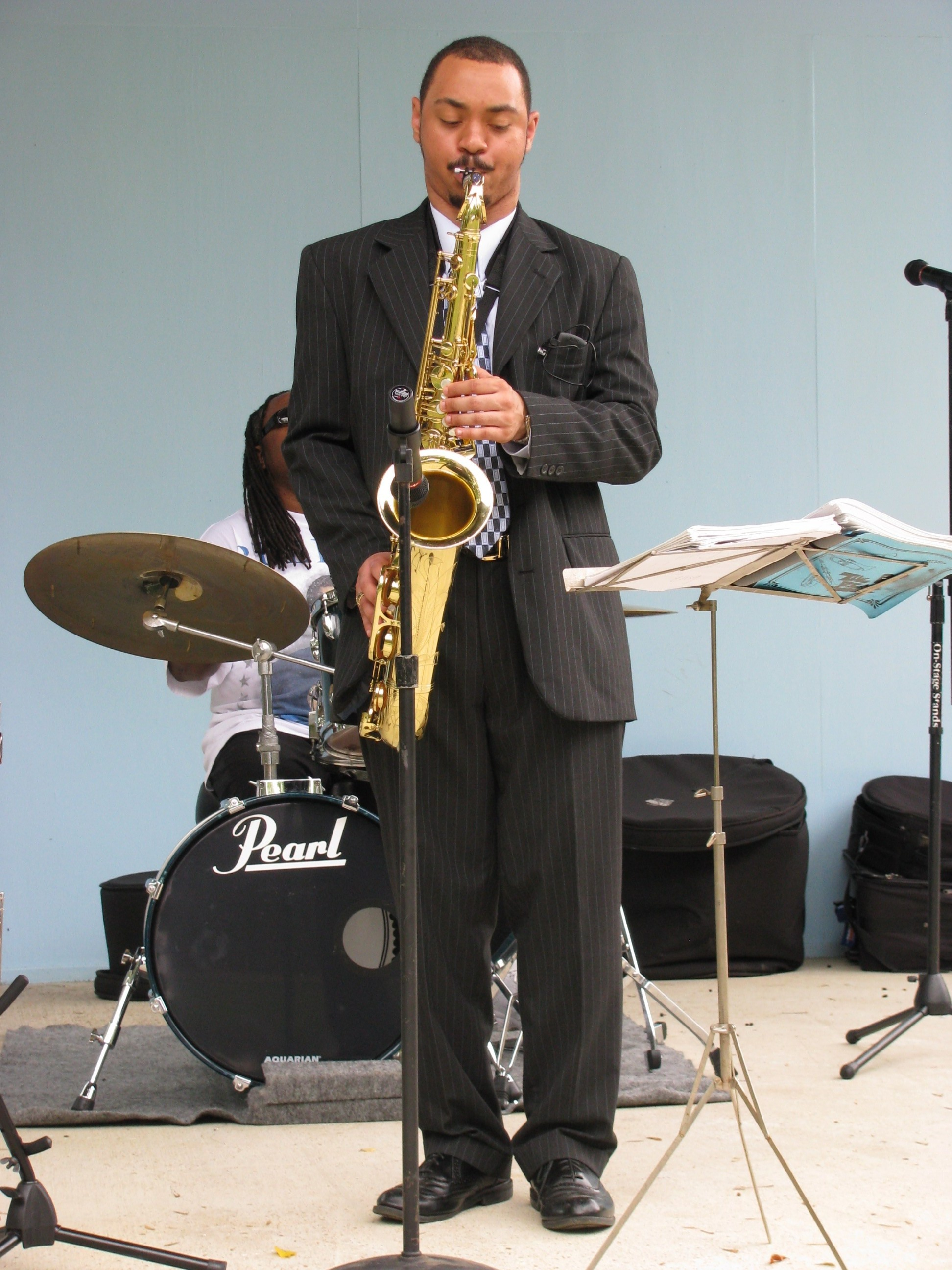
Performances are also held at the zoo.
