= Tupelo Buffalo Park and Zoo =

Zoo in Tupelo, Mississippi, United States

Tupelo Buffalo Park & Zoo
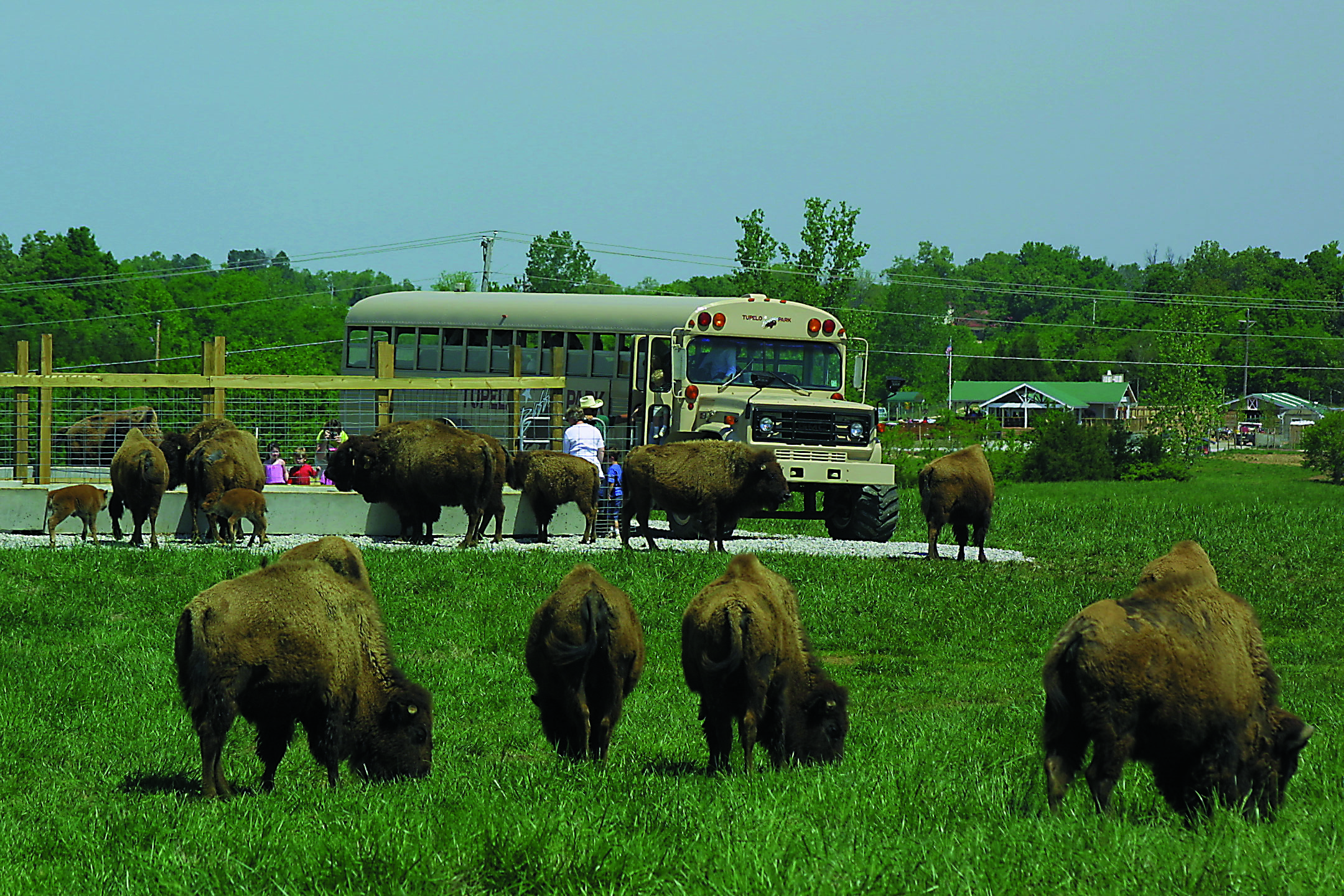
- A large herd of bison roam the park.
- Interactive map of Tupelo Buffalo Park & Zoo
- 34.2869°N 88.7687°W
- Date opened: 2001; 25 years ago
- Location: Tupelo, Mississippi, United States
- Land area: 210 acres (0.85 km^{2})
- No. of animals: 450
- No. of species: 125
- Owner: Dan and Shelia Franklin
- Website: www.tupelobuffalopark.com

The Tupelo Buffalo Park and Zoo is a zoo located in Tupelo, Mississippi. At 210 acres (0.85 km^{2}), the zoo is the largest zoo in the state of Mississippi.

== History ==
The Tupelo Buffalo Park and Zoo was founded by Dan Franklin in 2001 and is located at 2272 North Coley Road. Previously the land was a cattle ranch and Dan then had some buffalo that became very popular with people wanting to visit. and over time the herd of buffalo would become one of the largest buffalo herds in the region.

== Buffalo ==
A large herd of American bison roam the park. This exhibit is one of the main exhibits of the zoo. Modified school buses with large, off-road tires take visitors into the park to see the herd.

=== Rare white buffalo ===
The Buffalo Park was home to Tukota, a rare white bison, not an albino. There are several great legends by the Sioux tribes explaining the creation and the infrequent occurrence of the white buffalo. A white buffalo is so rare in fact that they only occur one time in five million births. Tukota was born at the park.

This made "Tukota" one of the more special animals at the Tupelo Buffalo Park and Zoo. His name was the winning submission from Mrs. Mills' 4th Grade class at Rankin Elementary School in 2002. Tukota died in early 2012 due to a fight with another buffalo in the park. His injuries were life-threatening, thus the decision was made to euthanize the rare animal.

== Animals ==
- African eland
- African lion
- Alligators
- Alpaca
- Black bear
- Ball python
- Bengal tiger
- Burmese pythons
- Camels
- Coyotes
- Horse
- Cougar
- Exotic birds
- Goats
- Emus
- Fallow deer
- Giraffes
- Kangaroos
- Lemurs
- Llamas
- Ostriches
- Snakes
- Bison
- Water buffalo
- Watusi cattle
- Ricardo the Python
- Yaks
- Zebras

== Attractions ==
- Live merry go round with ponies
- Horseback riding through the park
- Snack bar
- Petting zoo
- Souvenir shop
- Animal feedings
- Playground with authentic teepees
- Camping area
- Annual rodeo each August
