= Kenahkihinén =

White buffalo

Kenahkihinén (Kĕ-Nah‛-Ki-Nĕn, from the Lenape language meaning 'Watch Over Us') (born November 12, 2006, died on the 18th December 2021) was a male white buffalo born at The Woodland Zoo & More in Farmington, Pennsylvania, and later residing at Nemacolin Woodlands Resort in Farmington. Born under extremely unusual circumstances, he was unlike any other known white buffalo born before him. He was neither leucistic, albino or a beefalo; he was pure buffalo. As with other rare white buffalo born in North America, he was considered by many Native Americans to be a sacred animal.

In August 2007 a second buffalo, a black female was born at The Woodland Zoo & More, under exactly the same unusual circumstances.

On April 14, 2007, Kenahkihinén was blessed by a delegation from the Lakota tribe led by one of its leaders David Swallow. Swallow spoke of the significance of the white buffalo, and at one stage told the crowd of about 100 that it "shows itself because there is a great need... There is great disaster coming -- sickness and war -- and the white buffalo comes to give us a warning".

September 2009, The Woodland Zoo & More closed, auctioning off all animals including the buffalo.

October 2009, both white and black buffalos were obtained and moved to Nemacolin Woodlands Resort. Nemacolin Woodlands Resort created a fifty-acre sanctuary for these two Sacred Animals.

November 14, 2009, Nagi White Owl, Cherokee, C'anupa Gluha Mani of Cante Tenza, Lakota, Louis Janis, Tokala, Lakota, Mary Johnson, Lakota, Gerald Ice, Lakota, Starr Hill, Harvey Arden and others gathered at Nemacolin Woodlands Resort. This ceremony was a thank you to Joseph Hardy of 84 Lumber and Maggie Hardy Magerko of Nemacolin Woodlands Resort, for providing a new home for these two Sacred Animals.

== See also ==
- The White Buffalo Calf Woman of Lakota myth
