= Martha McSally =

American politician and military pilot (born 1966)

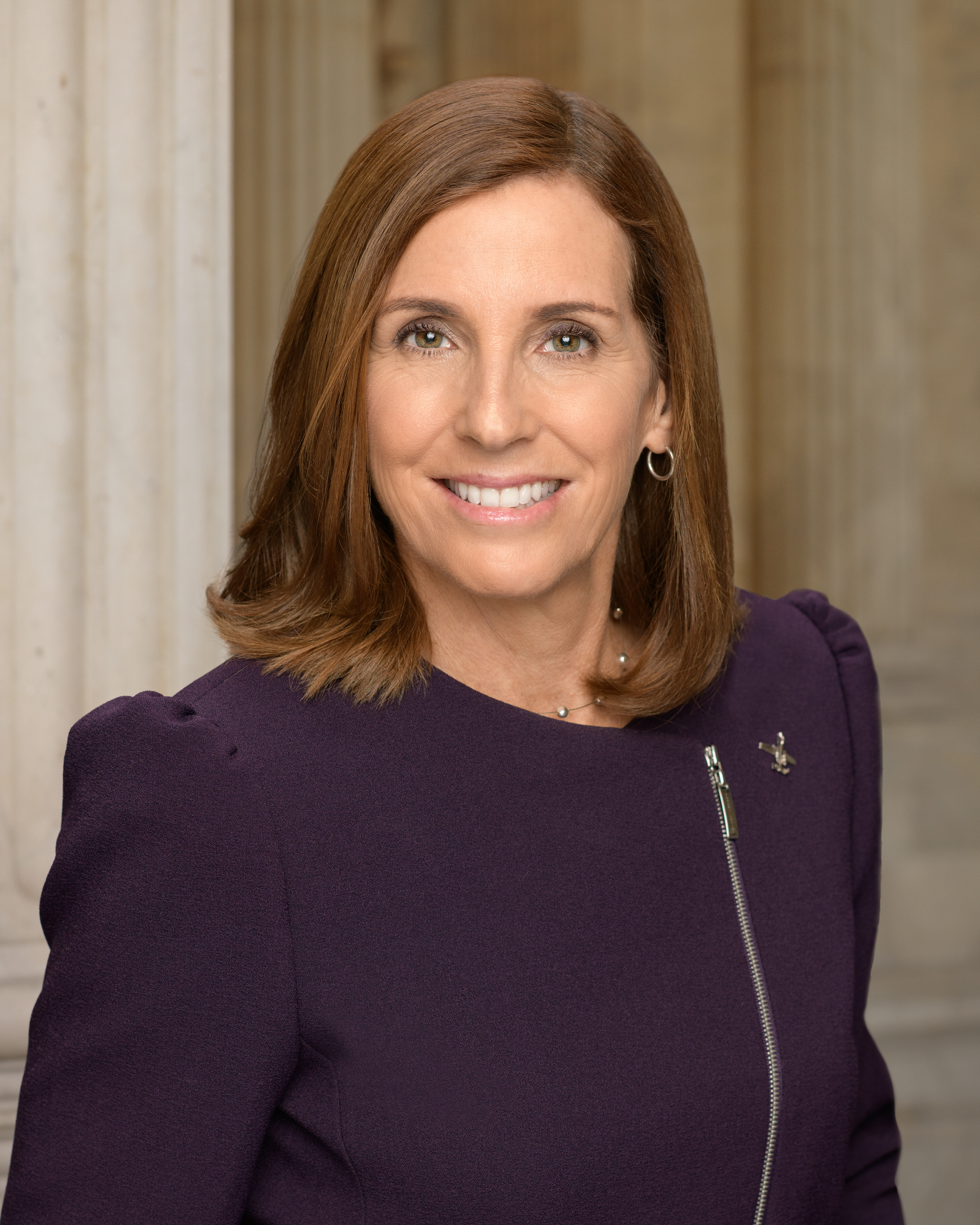
- Official portrait, 2019

United States Senator from Arizona
- In office January 3, 2019 – December 2, 2020
- Appointed by: Doug Ducey
- Preceded by: Jon Kyl
- Succeeded by: Mark Kelly

Member of the U.S. House of Representatives from Arizona's 2nd district
- In office January 3, 2015 – January 3, 2019
- Preceded by: Ron Barber
- Succeeded by: Ann Kirkpatrick

Personal details
- Born: Martha Elizabeth McSally; March 22, 1966 (age 60) Warwick, Rhode Island, U.S.
- Party: Republican
- Spouse: Donald Henry (m. 1997; ann. 1999)
- Education: United States Air Force Academy (BS); Harvard University (MPP)

Military service
- Branch/service: United States Air Force
- Years of service: 1988–2010
- Rank: Colonel
- Commands: 354th Fighter Squadron
- Battles/wars: Operation Southern Watch; Operation Allied Force; Operation Enduring Freedom
- McSally's voice McSally introducing Michael Liburdi at a Senate Judiciary Committee hearing. Recorded February 13, 2019

Martha Elizabeth McSally (born March 22, 1966) is a former American politician and former military pilot who represented Arizona in both chambers of Congress between 2015 and 2020. She is the most recent Republican to serve Arizona in the U.S. Senate.

McSally served in the United States Air Force from 1988 to 2010, achieving the rank of colonel. She is the first U.S. woman to fly in combat and also the first to command a fighter squadron. In 2001, McSally successfully sued the United States Department of Defense in McSally v. Rumsfeld, challenging the military policy that required U.S. and UK servicewomen stationed in Saudi Arabia to wear the body-covering abaya when traveling off base in the country.

A member of the Republican Party, McSally ran for the U.S. House of Representatives in 2012, but was unsuccessful. She was elected to the House in 2014 and represented Arizona's 2nd congressional district from 2015 to 2019. McSally was the Republican nominee in Arizona's 2018 U.S. Senate election, losing to Democrat Kyrsten Sinema. After interim Senator Jon Kyl resigned from the state's other Senate seat (to which he had been appointed following the death of longtime Senator John McCain), Governor Doug Ducey appointed McSally to replace Kyl. In 2020, a special election was held to determine who would serve the remainder of McCain's unexpired Senate term; McSally was defeated by Democratic nominee Mark Kelly.

McSally opposes same-sex marriage and opposes abortion in "nearly all cases", and advocates for increased military spending. McSally opposed and voted to repeal the Affordable Care Act and supported the unsuccessful attempt to pass American Health Care Act of 2017. Though criticizing Obama's use of executive action to create it, she supported Deferred Action for Childhood Arrivals until 2018 and expressed concern about President Donald Trump's travel ban and the family separation policy.

== Early life and education ==
McSally was born in 1966 in Warwick, Rhode Island, the youngest of five children. When she was 12 years of age, her father Bernard died suddenly due to a massive heart attack. Her mother, Eleanor, worked as a reading specialist to support the family.

McSally was the valedictorian at St. Mary Academy – Bay View in 1984. During an interview with The Wall Street Journal in April 2018, McSally alleged her track and field coach pressured her into a sexual relationship during her senior year at the Catholic girls' school. She said that the coach used "emotional manipulation" to keep her compliant. She did not reveal the incident to friends or family until ten years after her graduation.

McSally earned an appointment to the United States Air Force Academy, graduating in 1988 with a Bachelor of Science in biology. She then earned a Master of Public Policy from Harvard University's John F. Kennedy School of Government and proceeded to pilot training.

== Military career ==
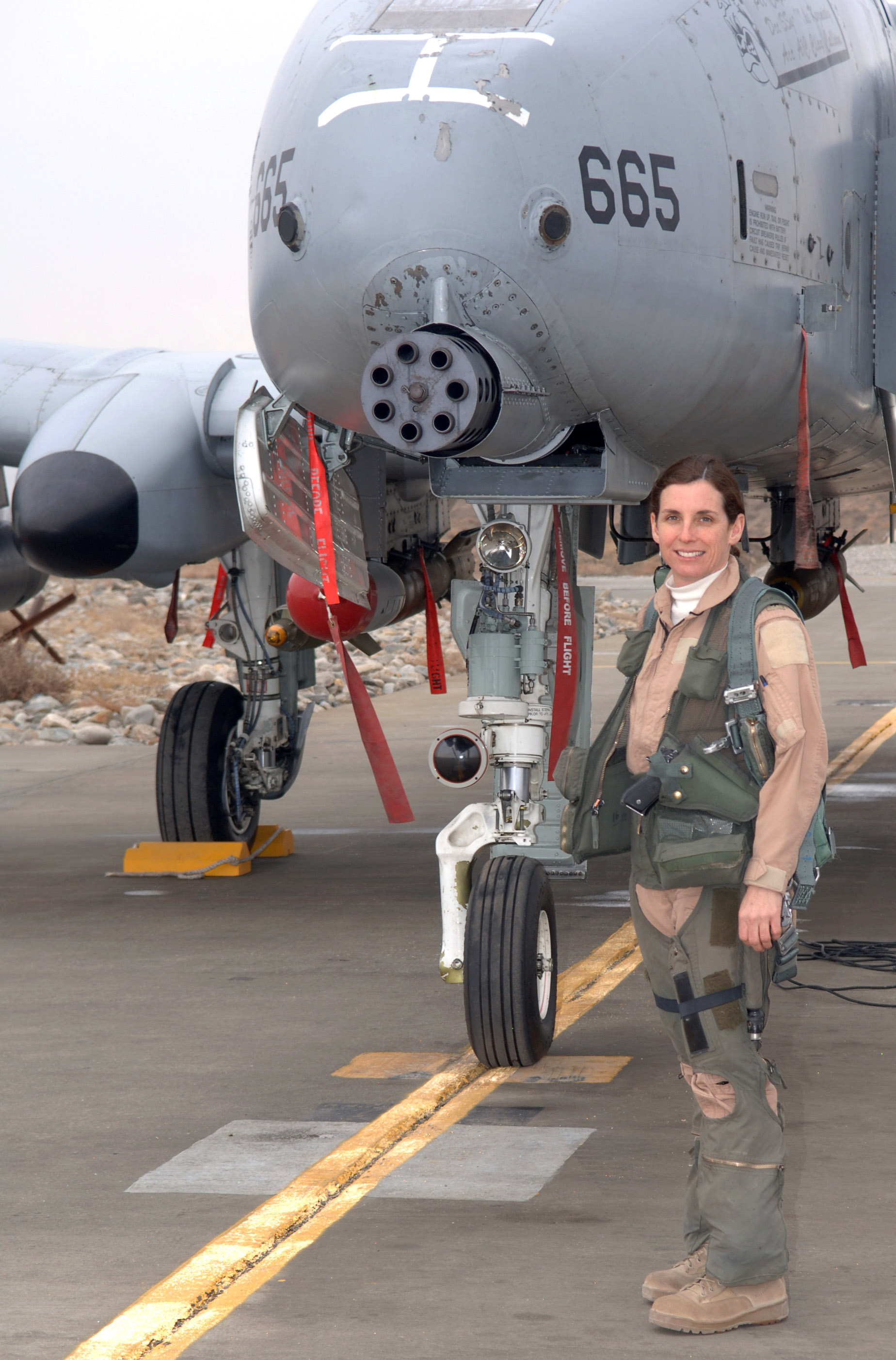
McSally with an A-10 Thunderbolt II

McSally earned her USAF pilot's wings in 1991 after completing Undergraduate Pilot Training at Williams Air Force Base east of Phoenix. Following graduation, she was assigned to Laughlin Air Force Base, Texas, as a First Assignment Instructor Pilot in the T-37 trainer. McSally went on to Lead-in Fighter Training in 1993.

McSally then completed Replacement Training Unit for the A-10 Thunderbolt II at Davis–Monthan Air Force Base and was assigned to an operational A-10 squadron that deployed to Kuwait in January 1995. During this deployment, she flew combat patrol over Iraq in support of Operation Southern Watch, enforcing the no-fly zone over southern Iraq and becoming "the first female U.S. fighter pilot to fly in combat and the first woman to command a fighter squadron."

In 1999, McSally deployed to Europe in support of Operation Allied Force. She was selected as one of seven active-duty Air Force officers for the Legislative Fellowship Program. She lived in Washington, D.C., working as a national security advisor to Senator Jon Kyl (R-AZ).

McSally took command of the 354th Fighter Squadron at Davis–Monthan Air Force Base in July 2004. She was subsequently deployed to Afghanistan during Operation Enduring Freedom. In 2006, McSally's squadron won the David C. Shilling Award, given by the Air Force Association "for the most outstanding contribution in the field of flight".

=== Lawsuit against the U.S. Department of Defense ===
McSally was represented by The Rutherford Institute in McSally v. Rumsfeld, a 2001 lawsuit against the Department of Defense, challenging the military policy that required U.S. and U.K. servicewomen stationed in Saudi Arabia to wear the body-covering abaya when traveling off base in the country. At the time of the lawsuit McSally, as a major (O-4), was the highest ranking figher female pilot in the U.S. Air Force. Her suit alleged "the regulations required her to send the message that she believes women are subservient to men." In 1995, while stationed in Kuwait, she was granted an audience with Secretary of Defense William Perry to urge the change to the policy, an extremely rare event for a junior officer in the US military.

In a 60 Minutes interview broadcast on CBS on January 20, 2002, she described the discrimination she experienced under the policy:

"I have to sit in the back and at all times I must be escorted by a male ... [who], when questioned, is supposed to claim me as his wife," she said. "I can fly a single-seat aircraft in enemy territory, but [in Saudi Arabia] I can't drive a vehicle.

The Department of Defense local policy was derived from guidance given by the US Embassy in Riyadh, following the 1991 Gulf War, to its staff as a measure to avoid harassment by Saudis and help women blend in. This was formalized in a General Order, despite the Department of State policy relaxing and changing over time.

General Tommy Franks, then commander of the United States Central Command, announced in 2002 that U.S. military servicewomen would no longer be required to wear the abaya, although they would be "encouraged" to do so as a show of respect for local customs. Commenting on the change, Central Command spokesman Colonel Rick Thomas said it was not made because of McSally's lawsuit but had already been "under review" before the lawsuit was filed. McSally had been working to change the policy for several years and had filed the lawsuit after she had been threatened with a court martial if she did not comply.

In 2002, Congress passed legislation prohibiting anyone in the military from "requiring or encouraging servicewomen to put on abayas in Saudi Arabia or to use taxpayers' money to buy them." Following her USAF career, McSally has continued to speak out about gender relations in Saudi Arabia.

=== Retirement ===
After retiring from the U.S. Air Force on May 6, 2010, she worked as a professor at the George C. Marshall European Center for Security Studies in Garmisch-Partenkirchen, Germany.

== U.S. House of Representatives ==
=== 2012 elections ===
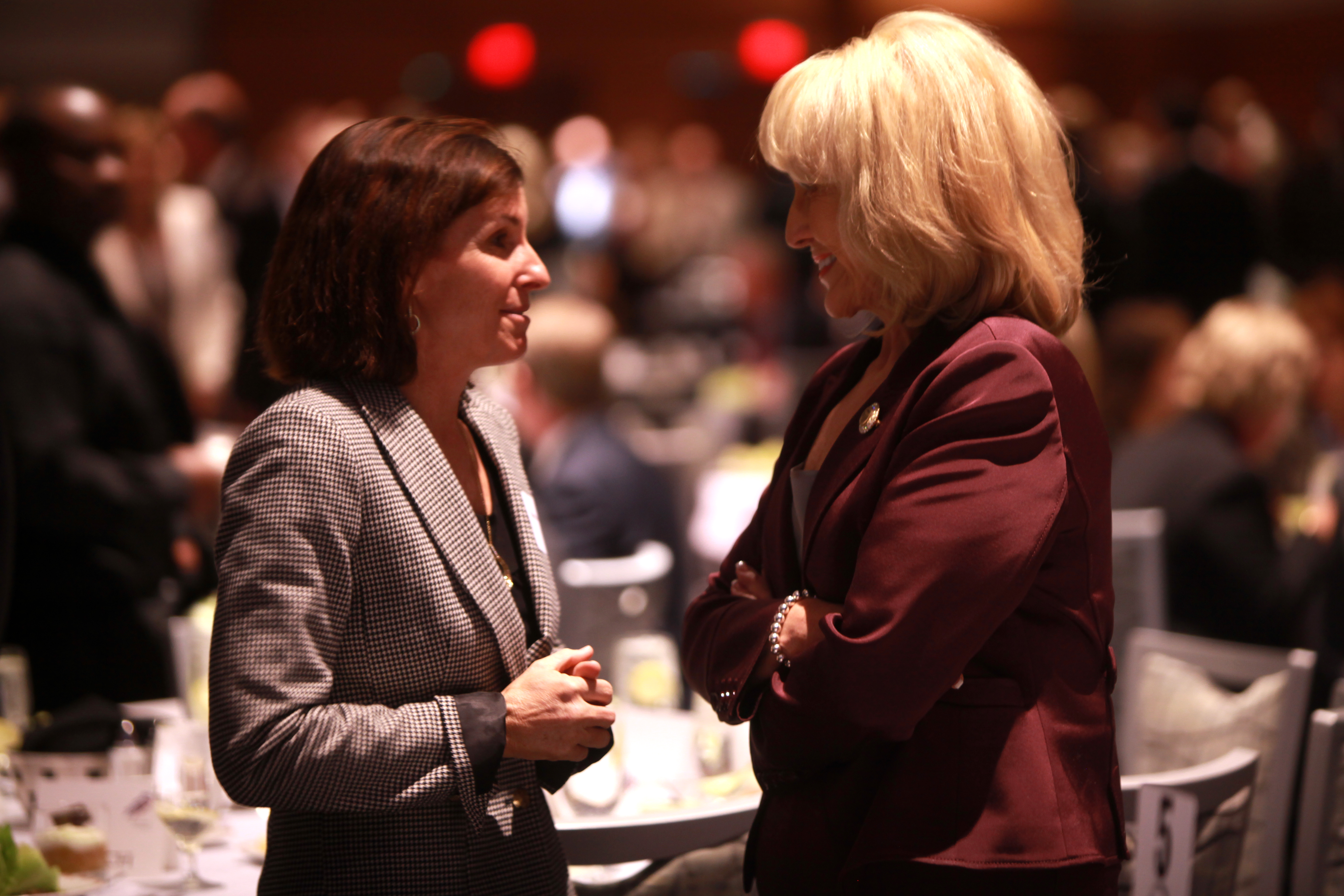
Candidate Martha McSally with Governor Jan Brewer at the Arizona Chamber of Commerce & Industry's 2014 Legislative Forecast Luncheon in Phoenix

On February 9, 2012, McSally announced her candidacy for the special election for Arizona's 8th congressional district vacancy created by the resignation of Gabby Giffords. She was an unsuccessful candidate in the Republican primary for the special election, finishing second to Jesse Kelly.

McSally then ran for and won the Republican nomination in the regular election for the district, which had been renumbered the 2nd district. She faced incumbent Democrat Ron Barber and Libertarian nominee Anthony Powell in the November 2012 election. She was endorsed by the National Federation of Independent Business, the United States Chamber of Commerce, the National Association of Wholesalers, and Associated Builders and Contractors.

The race was one of the closest in the nation. McSally led on election night by a few hundred votes, but the race was deemed too close to call due to a large number of provisional ballots. Barber eventually overtook McSally as more ballots were counted. By November 16, most of the outstanding ballots were in heavily Democratic precincts near Tucson. The Arizona Republic determined that McSally would not be able to pick up enough votes to overcome Barber's lead. By November 17, Barber's lead had grown to 1,400 votes. That day, the Associated Press determined that there were not enough ballots outstanding for McSally to regain the lead and called the race for Barber. She conceded the race later that morning.

=== 2014 election ===
McSally declared her intention of running again for the 2nd district seat in 2014. She won the June 3 primary against two opponents, taking nearly 70% of the vote. In the November 4 general election, the race was too close to call by the end of election night and eventually became the final federal election of the 2014 cycle to be decided. With 100% of the votes counted, McSally had a 161-vote lead and declared victory on November 12, 2014, but because the margin of victory was less than 1%, an automatic recount was called on December 1. On December 17, the official recount declared McSally the winner by 167 votes. She is only the second Republican ever to represent a southern Arizona-based district in the U.S. House of Representatives; the first was Jim Kolbe, who represented what is now the 2nd district, from 1985 to 2007. McSally is also the first female Republican representative from Arizona.

=== 2016 election ===
McSally ran for reelection in 2016, and was unopposed in the Republican primary. She defeated Democratic opponent Matt Heinz by a margin of 57 to 43 percent in the general election.

=== Tenure ===
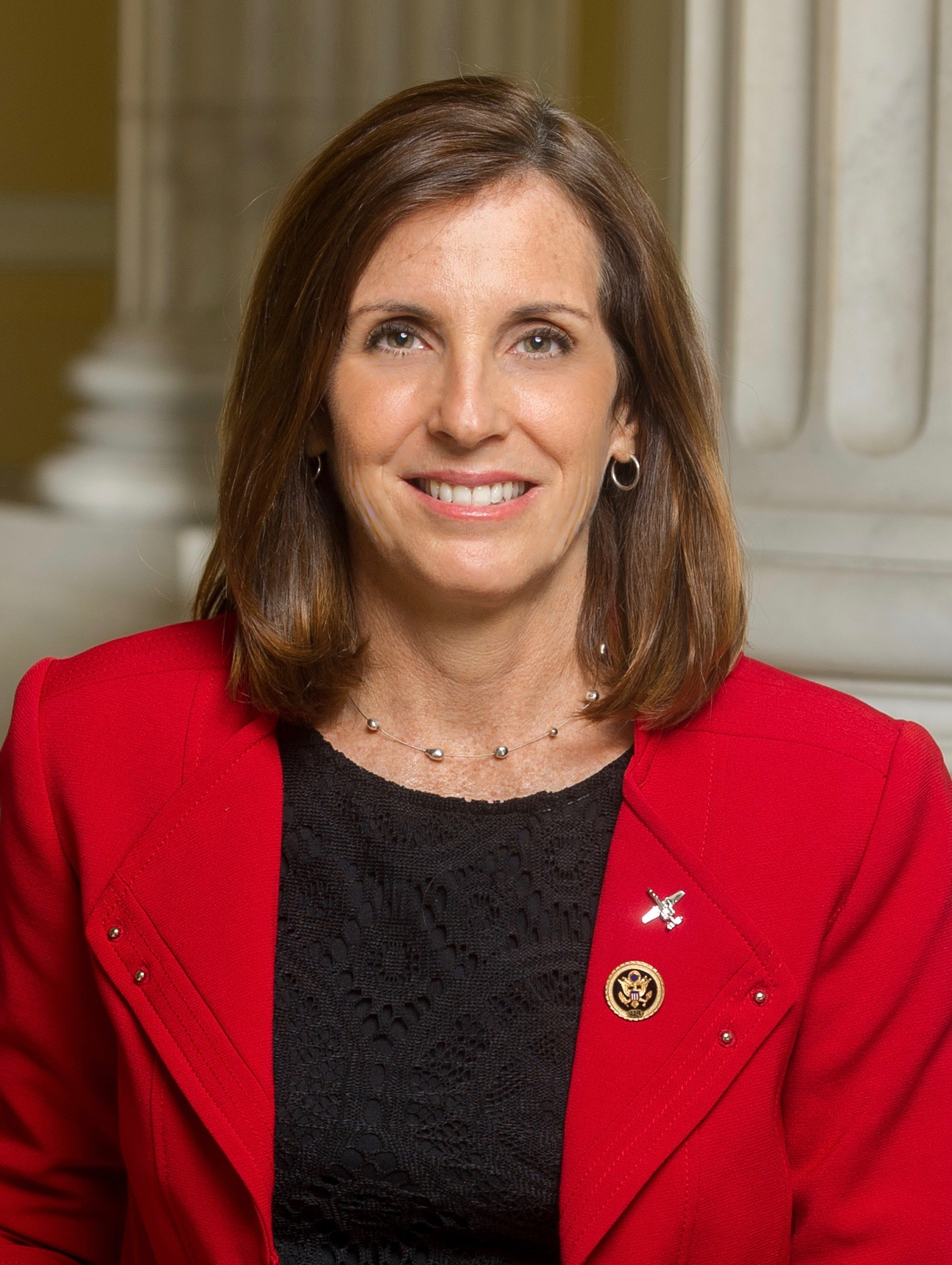
McSally's portrait during the 115th Congress

After she was first elected to the U.S. House, McSally hired C.J. Karamargin, who was formerly the communications director for Democratic U.S. Representative Gabby Giffords, as her district director.

In her freshman term in Congress, McSally had seven bills approved by the U.S. House. Among all members of the U.S. House, McSally was tied for third as of 2016 in the number of bills she had authored that have made it through the House. Her bills were generally "narrowly drawn proposals to improve homeland security or to help veterans."

During her early years in Congress, McSally had a reputation as a political moderate. According to The Arizona Republic, McSally was "one of the most prolific fundraisers among House members not holding a leadership role, while cultivating a reputation as a conscientious and moderate lawmaker."

== U.S. Senate ==
=== Elections ===
==== 2018 ====
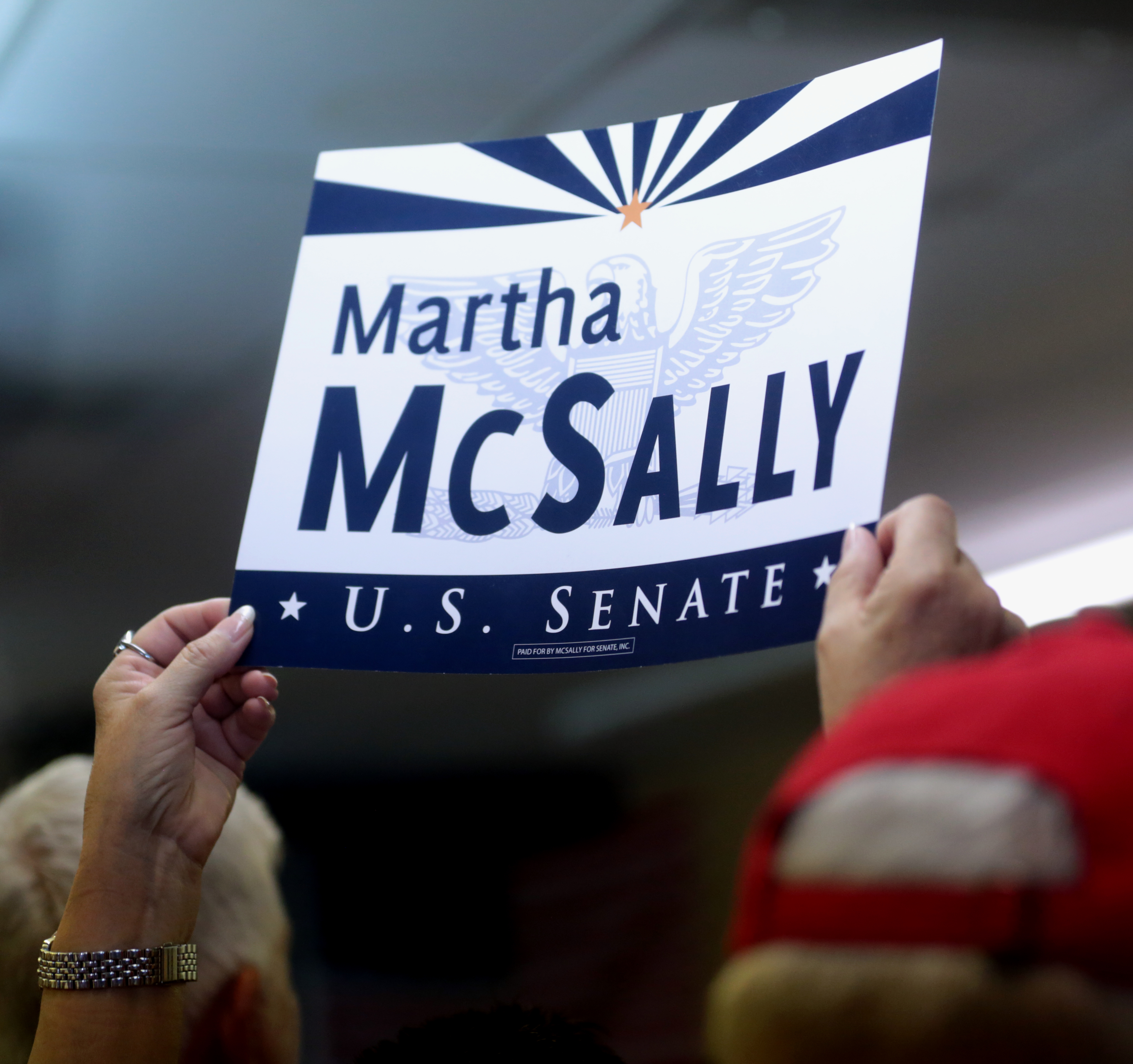
A campaign sign for McSally's 2018 Senate campaign

On January 12, 2018, McSally announced her candidacy for the U.S. Senate seat being vacated by the retirement of U.S. Senator Jeff Flake. McSally announced her campaign in Tucson, then flew to Phoenix and Prescott for subsequent campaign announcement rallies. An online video announcing McSally's campaign featured her telling Washington, D.C., Republicans "to grow a pair of ovaries." The announcement represented a "sharp right turn" from McSally's centrist reputation.

McSally was expected to run as the establishment candidate in the Republican primary, where her opponents included former state senator Kelli Ward and former Maricopa County Sheriff Joe Arpaio. McSally, a strong fundraiser, was the preferred candidate of national Republicans and Arizona Governor Doug Ducey. McSally's history of criticizing President Donald Trump drew rebuke from conservative groups including the Club for Growth, the Senate Conservatives Fund, and FreedomWorks. McSally had previously distanced herself from Trump, choosing not to endorse him in 2016 and calling his comments about sexual assault "disgusting" and "unacceptable." But in the lead-up to announcing her candidacy for Senate, McSally began to embrace Trump, running ads echoing his conservative immigration policy positions. Politico wrote: "Martha McSally wants to make one thing clear before she launches an Arizona Senate campaign: She's a big fan of President Donald Trump."

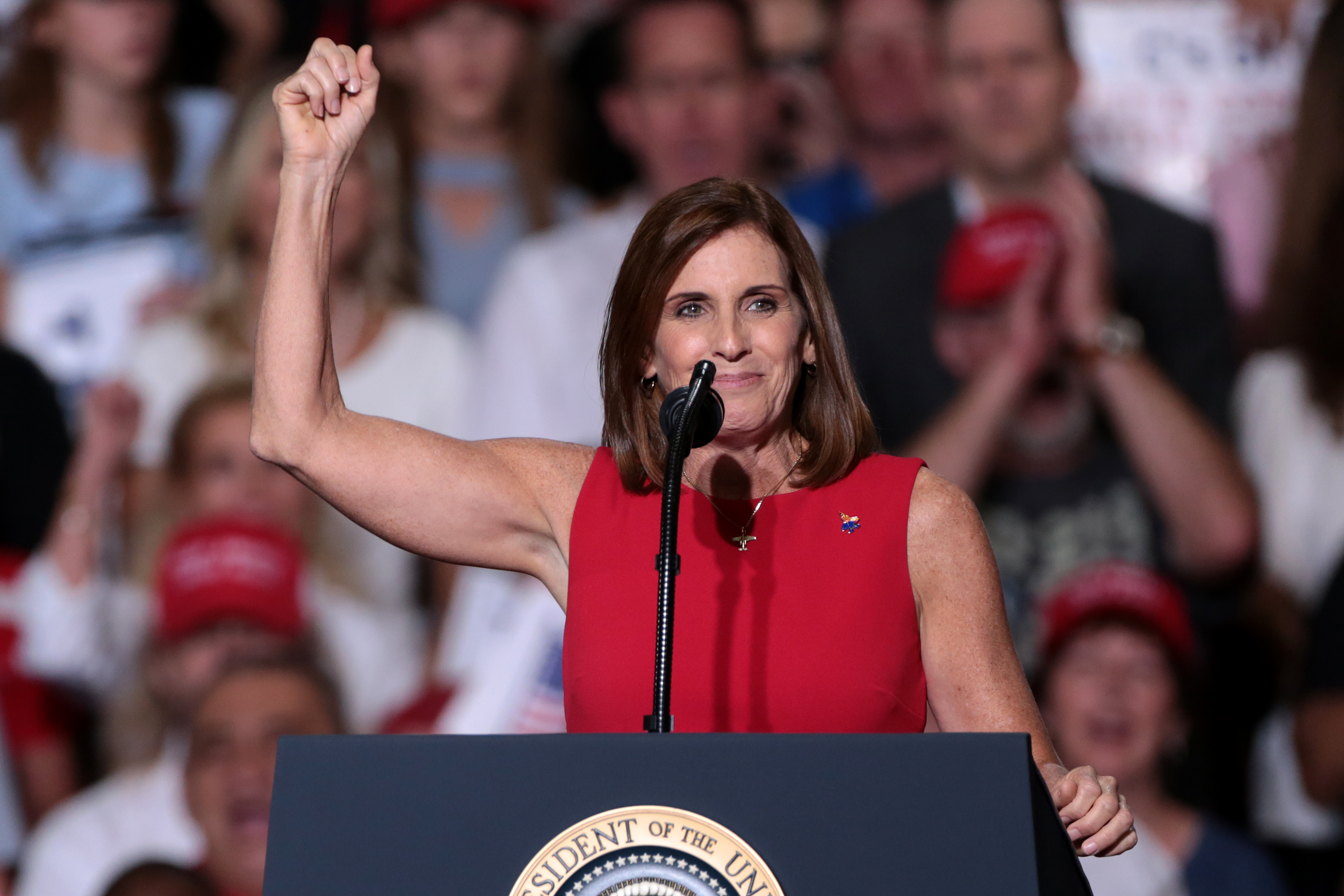
McSally speaking at a rally hosted by President Donald Trump in October 2018.

In an August 2018 candidate forum hosted by the Arizona Republic in advance of the Republican U.S. Senate primary, McSally and opponent Kelli Ward both said they were unconcerned with Trump's personal character, viewing it as a nonissue in the race. McSally criticized what she said was the media's and Democrats' "obsession" with Trump's character.

McSally won the August 28 Republican primary with 53 percent of the vote and faced Democratic nominee Kyrsten Sinema in the November general election. The general election remained undecided for several days after election night until all ballots were counted in the close contest. McSally held a lead by the end of election night, but it narrowed over the next few days as more ballots were counted. During this time, both McSally and Sinema voiced support for counting all the ballots. There was no evidence of any fraud. On November 12, McSally conceded to Sinema, congratulating her on becoming Arizona's first female senator. Sinema won by almost 56,000 votes. In May 2021, former deputy campaign manager Anthony Barry pleaded guilty to the theft of $115,000 campaign funds from the McSally campaign.

==== 2020 special ====
The death of longtime U.S. senator John McCain on August 25, 2018 triggered, in accordance with the 17th amendment, a November 2020 special election. McSally ran to complete the term to which she had been appointed by Governor Doug Ducey, defeating skincare executive Daniel McCarthy in the Republican primary. In the general election, she faced former astronaut Mark Kelly, who ran uncontested in the Democratic primary. Kelly defeated McSally with 51.2% of the vote. She initially refused to concede the election even though results showed that the margin was too large to overcome with remaining ballots.

=== Appointment ===
After Senator John McCain died and his appointed successor, Senator Jon Kyl, resigned, Arizona's other Senate seat was to become vacant at the beginning of 2019. On December 18, 2018, Governor Ducey announced that he was appointing McSally to the seat. She was the third of four Senators to serve during the nineteenth Senate term for the Arizona's Class 3 seat, from January 3, 2017 to January 3, 2023.

McSally's appointment proved controversial. McCain's daughter Meghan criticized the appointment, claiming that McSally "didn't earn" her seat, and the conservative Washington Times called the appointment "anti-democratic." A lawsuit was filed on behalf of Arizona voters claiming the appointment violated the 17th amendment to the U.S. Constitution. The suit was eventually dismissed and the appointment allowed to stand.

McSally and Sinema, who were sworn in on the same day, were the first two women to serve as U.S. senators from Arizona. This made Arizona one of six states with two women serving as its senators (the others were California, Minnesota, Nevada, New Hampshire, and Washington). Only once before have two female senators representing the same state at the same time been of different parties (in New Hampshire from 2011 to 2017). McSally was the first senator ever appointed to serve alongside someone to whom she initially lost an election, and the first to serve alongside a colleague she lost to in the election immediately preceding the inauguration. McSally and Sinema were the second pair of senators to serve together after having campaigned against each other the year before; the first such instance occurred in 1996–1997 in Oregon, when Democrat Ron Wyden defeated Republican Gordon H. Smith in a special election, only for Smith to win the regular election for the state's other Senate seat later that year.

=== Tenure ===
McSally was sworn in as a U.S. senator on January 3, 2019.

On February 5, 2019, McSally voted for the Strengthening America's Security in the Middle East Act of 2019. Seven days later, along with fellow Arizona Senator Kyrsten Sinema, she voted for S.47, a public land package. On February 14, McSally voted to confirm William Barr as Attorney General. On February 28, she voted to confirm Andrew Wheeler as EPA Administrator. In February 2020, she voted to acquit President Donald Trump of articles of impeachment on charges of abuse of power and obstruction of Congress.

On January 16, 2020, McSally told CNN correspondent Manu Raju "you're a liberal hack. I'm not talking to you", when he asked her whether she would consider new evidence during Trump's impeachment trial in the Senate. She later affirmed her remarks on Twitter and told Fox News's Laura Ingraham, "I'm a fighter pilot... I called it like it is." McSally's election campaign soon began selling the comments on t-shirts.

==== Response to COVID-19 pandemic ====
During the COVID-19 pandemic, McSally praised President Trump for his response to the crisis. On April 2, 2020, she called for the World Health Organization director general to step down. A Democratic super PAC targeted McSally over her coronavirus response and comments she made in early March saying that "calling on people to stay home from work or to skip spring break trips is 'too much of a panicked reaction.'"

In May 2020, McSally said she would not commit to further coronavirus relief funding. She said that Democratic-voting states and cities, such as Chicago and New York, had mismanaged their budgets for decades and that they should not expect to get aid. A spokeswoman for her office later said her comments were not meant to be public.

McSally has argued that, because of the pandemic, China should forgive U.S. debts.

=== Committee assignments ===
- Committee on Armed Services
  - Subcommittee on Airland
  - Subcommittee on Personnel
  - Subcommittee on Readiness and Management Support
- Committee on Banking, Housing, and Urban Affairs
  - Subcommittee on Housing, Transportation, and Community Development
  - Subcommittee on National Security and International Trade and Finance
  - Subcommittee on Securities, Insurance, and Investment
- Committee on Energy and Natural Resources
  - Subcommittee on Energy
  - Subcommittee on Public Lands, Forests, and Mining
  - Subcommittee on Water and Power (Chairwoman)
- Committee on Indian Affairs
- Special Committee on Aging

== Political positions ==
When she served in the U.S. House, McSally was a member of the Tuesday Group, a congressional caucus of moderate Republicans. She was a member of the Republican Main Street Partnership.

The American Conservative Union gives McSally a lifetime 75% conservative rating; she received a yearly rating of 84% in 2018. The fiscally conservative political action committee Americans for Prosperity gave her a rating of 87% in 2018. Conservative Review gave McSally a 37% conservative score in 2018, and Heritage Action gave her a 59% conservative rating. Conversely, the American Civil Liberties Union gave McSally a rating of 23% in 2016, and the Americans for Democratic Action gave her a 5% score.

=== Abortion ===
McSally identifies as "pro-life" or anti-abortion and in 2018 said she "opposes abortions in nearly all cases, with exceptions for rape, incest and the mother's health and life." In 2015, she voted for a 20-week abortion ban, joining other Republicans in what was mostly a party-line vote. In 2018, McSally voted to defund Planned Parenthood. She supports banning federal funding for abortions but opposed a government shutdown over defunding Planned Parenthood that same year.

Asked whether the Supreme Court's decision in Roe v. Wade should be overturned, McSally did not take a position. In May 2019, she was asked about a law passed in Alabama that would ban abortions even in cases of rape or incest. McSally initially did not take a position, calling it a "state issue," but she later announced that she opposed the law because she supports exceptions for rape and incest.

Planned Parenthood, which supports legal abortion, gives McSally a lifetime rating of 12% and Population Connection, which is pro-abortion rights and supports voluntary family planning, gave her a 33% score in 2016. NARAL Pro-Choice America gave her a 7% pro-choice rating. National Right to Life Committee, which opposes legal abortion, gave her a rating of 87% pro-life in 2018 and 100% pro-life in 2019. Population Connection gave McSally a 25% grade in 2015 and a 0% in 2017. In 2018, she was endorsed by Arizona Right to Life, which opposes legal abortion.

=== Budget and taxes ===
McSally voted in favor of the Tax Cuts and Jobs Act of 2017. She discounted polls showing the bill as unpopular among voters, calling it "hysteria" and "misinformation" and saying that "the best counter to that is when people see money in their paychecks."

=== Donald Trump ===
As of April 2020, McSally has voted with President Trump about 95% of the time. In 2016, she did not endorse Trump in the presidential election and did not take a position on whether voters in her district should vote for him. She called Trump's comments in the Access Hollywood tape "disgusting" and "unacceptable". McSally recast herself as a Trump ally and reliable Republican vote in her 2018 campaign for the U.S. Senate.

In February 2017, McSally voted with her party against a resolution that would have directed the House to request 10 years of Trump's tax returns, which would then have been reviewed by the House Ways and Means Committee in a closed session.

In December 2019, amid the impeachment inquiry into President Trump over his alleged attempts to get the President of Ukraine to announce an investigation into Joe Biden and his son, McSally said she had not been convinced that Trump should be impeached. In 2020, during Trump's Senate impeachment trial, she voted against allowing additional witnesses and documents and voted to acquit Trump of all charges.

=== Drug policy ===
McSally opposes legalizing both recreational and medical cannabis.

=== Economic policy ===
McSally opposes the Raise the Wage Act, which would gradually raise the federal minimum wage to $15 an hour.

In March 2020, McSally became a cosponsor of legislation to repeal the Davis-Bacon Act of 1931, which requires paying laborers and mechanics the local prevailing wages for public works projects.

=== Education ===
In 2012, McSally said she "wants the federal government out of the education business."

=== Energy and environment ===
McSally did not take a position on Trump's decision to withdraw the United States from the Paris Climate Accord. As of 2019, she had a lifetime score of 6% from the League of Conservation Voters.

In 2015, McSally co-sponsored the Mexican Wolf Transparency Act, a bill that would delist the Mexican wolf as an endangered species and halt a United States Fish and Wildlife Service recovery program that aims to reintroduce the wolf to areas in Arizona.

McSally supported the Apache Solar Project in 2016. In October 2017, once construction was completed, she gave the keynote address at its dedication, calling it a "great example of member-driven co-ops, from the bottom up, figuring out ways to provide reliable power to the community, instead of top-down bureaucrats telling them what to do." She called the project a "case study" for the rest of the country in that other communities could learn how to provide customers with "low-cost, competitive renewable power."

=== Foreign and defense policy ===
Politico called McSally's foreign policy "hawkish" in 2016. She criticized the international nuclear agreement with Iran and has praised defense contractors. During the House consideration of the National Defense Authorization Act for Fiscal Year 2016, McSally, along with John McCain, fought to increase military spending, particularly on the Tomahawk missile and other programs of Raytheon Co., one of Arizona's largest employers. She has been an ardent opponent of the retirement of the A-10 "Warthog", a warplane that has a strong presence at the Davis-Monthan Air Force Base near Tucson. She opposes the budget sequestration's effects on military spending.

McSally has introduced legislation to reduce funding for U.S. military bands. She supports the indefinite detentions at the Guantanamo Bay detention camp and opposed President Obama's efforts to close the camp.

In 2015, McSally said the air strikes taking place against ISIL were not effective but did not give an opinion on whether the U.S. should send ground troops into Iraq and Syria.

In July 2018, McSally issued a statement touting Trump's actions to prevent "Russian aggression": she listed sanctions, the expulsion of diplomats, and working with NATO as some of them. At the same time, she posited Trump's words were not as strong as his actions. In January 2019, McSally was one of 11 Republican senators to vote to advance legislation intended to prevent President Trump from lifting sanctions against three Russian companies.

In October 2019, McSally was one of six senators to sign a bipartisan letter to Trump calling on him to "urge Turkey to end their offensive and find a way to a peaceful resolution while supporting our Kurdish partners to ensure regional stability" and arguing that to leave Syria without installing protections for American allies would endanger both them and the US.

McSally has expressed concern about Chinese involvement in the United States, saying that Americans "are being played by the Chinese Communist Party."

=== Gun policy ===
In 2012, when asked about her position on the "gun show loophole", McSally said she opposed limits on gun sales as unconstitutional.

In 2019, the Arizona Mirror wrote that McSally "has suggested some willingness to consider gun control measures, an apparent shift from her previous stance on the topic." McSally said she was considering "specific legislative efforts to prevent gun violence, like red flag laws, assault weapons bans and stricter background checks".

As of 2019, McSally had received $372,615 from gun rights groups, the fifth most of any federal lawmaker since 1989.

=== Health care ===
McSally supports repealing the Affordable Care Act ("Obamacare"). In January 2017, she voted for a Republican-sponsored budget resolution that began the process of repealing the Act. When running for the Senate in 2018, McSally said, "we cannot go back to where we were before Obamacare".

McSally supported the March 2017 version of the American Health Care Act, and voted on May 4, 2017, to repeal the Affordable Care Act and pass a revised version of the American Health Care Act. Before voting on the bill, she declined to answer questions by reporters on where she stood, saying "I'm not publicly sharing my position." According to the Associated Press, on the date of the vote McSally stood up at a meeting of the House Republican Conference and told her colleagues to get this "fucking thing" done. The version of the American Health Care Act that she voted for had not been scored by the nonpartisan Congressional Budget Office; the previous version of the bill was estimated to cause 24 million Americans to become uninsured by 2026. The revised version of the bill allowed states to ask for a waiver that would allow insurers to charge individuals with preexisting conditions more. McSally said the bill was "not perfect" but that it was better than the "failed system" of the Affordable Care Act. After the AHCA passed, McSally proposed a stand-alone bill to strike the exemption of Congress from state waiver provisions; it passed by a 429–0 vote and would require 60 votes to pass the U.S. Senate.

In October 2019, McSally was one of 27 senators to sign a letter to Senate Majority Leader Mitch McConnell and Senate Minority Leader Chuck Schumer advocating the passage of the Community Health Investment, Modernization, and Excellence (CHIME) Act, which was set to expire the following month. The senators warned that if the funding for the Community Health Center Fund (CHCF) was allowed to expire, it "would cause an estimated 2,400 site closures, 47,000 lost jobs, and threaten the health care of approximately 9 million Americans".

=== Immigration ===
Once a supporter of immigration reform, McSally has embraced a hard-line conservative position on immigration since Trump's election.

In December 2014, McSally criticized Obama's executive actions on immigration (the Deferred Action for Childhood Arrivals (DACA) program and the Deferred Action for Parents of Americans (DAPA) program), saying that it was "absolutely inappropriate" of Obama to take these actions rather than "allowing the new Congress to sit and try to sort it out". In January 2015, McSally was one of 26 Republicans who voted against an amendment to a spending bill that would end DACA. She said it would be unfair to deport undocumented immigrants brought to the U.S. as children. In September 2017, McSally was one of 10 Republicans who sent a letter to Speaker Paul Ryan asking for a legislative solution for those under DACA status. While criticizing Obama's action in creating the program, the letter said, "It would be wrong to go back on our word and subject these individuals to deportation". In May 2018, while facing a primary challenge from the right, McSally pulled her support and cosponsorship of a DACA bill that she had sponsored since April 2017. Instead, she expressed support for a more conservative bill that would cut legal immigration, dramatically increase spending on border security, and provide indefinite stay for DREAMers but not give them a path to citizenship. In June 2018, CNN reported that the McSally campaign had removed a video from her website in which she praised DACA. According to The Arizona Republic, McSally sought through these actions during the primary "to downplay and hide" her past support for DACA.

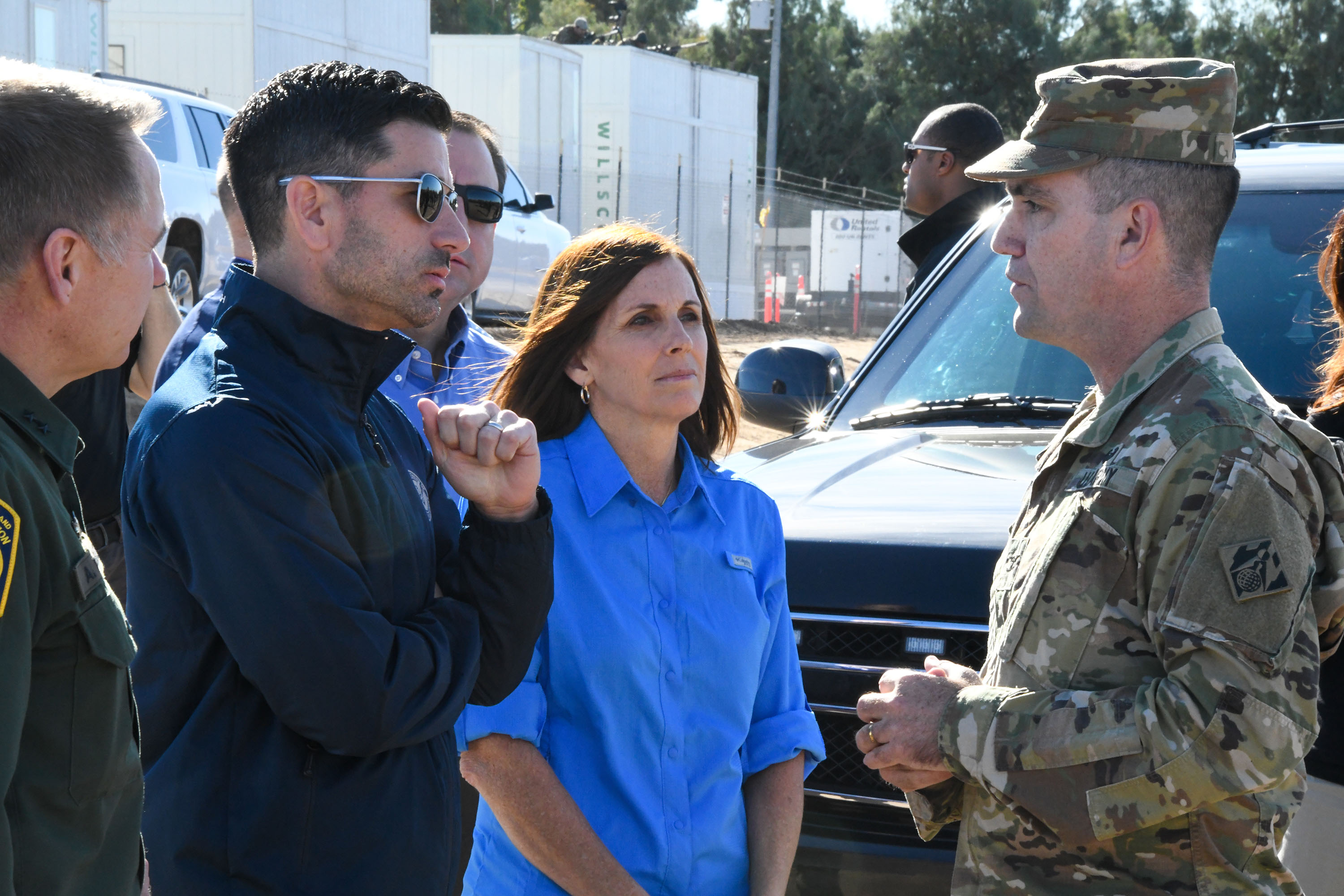
McSally tours the border wall system in Yuma with Acting Homeland Security Secretary Chad Wolf.

In January 2017, after Trump issued an executive order suspending the entry of foreigners from seven Muslim-majority countries into the United States, McSally issued a statement saying the U.S. should look at "gaps in our vetting processes" but that she had "concerns about certain individuals being denied entry".

McSally did not fault the Trump administration for the family separation policy but indicated that she preferred a different outcome than separating immigrant children from their parents. McSally instead criticized Congress for the family separation policy that the Trump administration implemented. In response to the Keep Families Together Act, which would have blocked the policy, she falsely claimed that the bill, backed by her Senate opponent Kyrsten Sinema, was "essentially encouraging child trafficking". When the Trump administration backtracked on the family separation policy, McSally said it was "welcome news".

In 2019, McSally voted against a resolution to reject Trump's use of an emergency declaration to build a border wall.

=== Internet and technology ===
McSally opposes net neutrality and signed a letter to FCC Chairman Ajit Pai in December 2017 urging him to repeal the Federal Communications Commission’s Open Internet Order.

In March 2017, McSally and then-Congresswoman Marsha Blackburn co-sponsored the Broadband Consumer Privacy Proposal, which repealed the FCC's internet privacy rules and allowed internet service providers to sell customers' browsing history without their permission.

=== LGBTQ rights ===
McSally opposes same-sex marriage and in 2018 said "philosophically, I believe marriage is between one man and one woman, and it should be left to the states". After the U.S. Supreme Court issued its decision in Obergefell v. Hodges, which upheld a constitutional right to same-sex marriage, McSally said she would "respect the Supreme Court's decision" but expressed the view that "this debate belongs at the state level".

She has declined to take a position on the Employment Non-Discrimination Act (ENDA), which would bar employers with more than 15 employees from engaging in employment discrimination on the basis of an "actual or perceived sexual orientation or gender identity". During her 2010 campaign, McSally indicated on a Center for Arizona Policy questionnaire that she opposes such additions to anti-discrimination law.

In May 2016, McSally voted for a bill that would have dismantled the Obama administration's executive action that made it illegal for government contractors to discriminate against people based on sexual orientation.

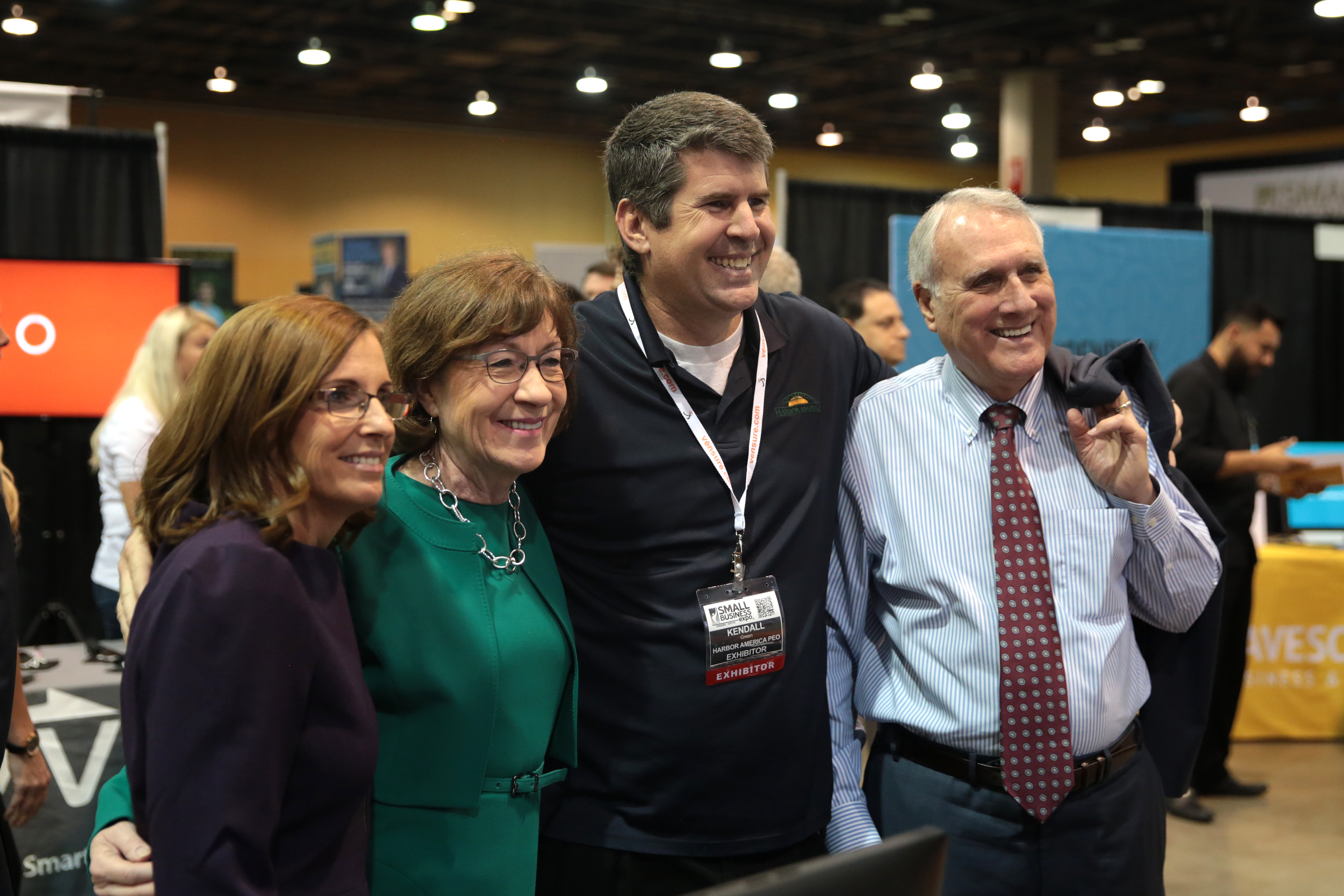
Congresswoman Martha McSally, Senators Susan Collins & Jon Kyl at 2018 Small Business Expo in Phoenix, Arizona

=== Social Security ===
McSally supports privatizing Social Security and raising the retirement age. She has described the existing system as "currently unsustainable".

=== Sexual assault ===
On March 6, 2019, during a hearing on Sexual Assault and Misconduct in the Military at the Armed Services Subcommittee on Personnel, McSally informed her colleagues that she had been raped by a superior officer while serving in the Air Force:

I also am a military sexual assault survivor, but unlike so many brave survivors, I didn't report being sexually assaulted. Like so many women and men, I didn't trust the system at the time. I blamed myself. I was ashamed and confused. I thought I was strong but felt powerless. The perpetrators abused their position of power in profound ways. In one case I was preyed upon and raped by a superior officer.

McSally did not name the officer who raped her. She expressed disgust at the failures of the military system and many commanders to address sexual violence.

On November 10, 2023, McSally claimed that she had been sexually assaulted while jogging alongside the Missouri River in Iowa, but she had fought and chased off her assailant. Subsequently, the suspect was detained on allegations of assault. McSally chased the man into the Tom Hanafan River’s Edge Park before calling the police.

== Electoral history ==
2012 Arizona's 8th congressional district special election (Republican primary, April 17)
Party	Candidate	Votes	%
Republican	Jesse Kelly	27,101	35.1
Republican	Martha McSally	19,413	25.1
Republican	Frank Antenori	17,497	22.6
Republican	Dave Sitton	13,299	17.2
Total votes		77,310	100

Arizona's 2nd congressional district election, 2012 (Republican primary, August 28)
Party	Candidate	Votes	%
Republican	Martha McSally	52,809	81.7%
Republican	Mark Koskiniemi	11,828	18.3%
Total votes		64,637	100

Arizona's 2nd congressional district election, 2012
Party	Candidate	Votes	%	±%
Democratic	Ron Barber	147,338	50.41%	+18.66%
Republican	Martha McSally	144,884	49.57%	−15.99%
Libertarian	Anthony Powell (Write-In)	57	0.02%	−4.05%
Turnout		292,279		
Democratic hold		Swing		

Arizona's 2nd congressional district, 2014 (Republican primary)
Party	Candidate	Votes	%
Republican	Martha McSally	45,492	69.11
Republican	Chuck Wooten	14,995	22.78
Republican	Shelley Kais	5,103	7.75
Republican	Write-in	235	0.36
Total votes		65,825	100

Arizona's 2nd congressional district election, 2014
Party	Candidate	Votes	%	±%
Republican	Martha McSally	109,704	50.01%	+0.44%
Democratic	Ron Barber (incumbent)	109,543	49.94%	−0.47%
N/A	Write-ins	104	0.05%	+0.03%
Turnout		219,351		
Republican gain from Democratic		Swing		

Arizona's 2nd congressional district election, 2016
Party	Candidate	Votes	%	±%
Republican	Martha McSally (incumbent)	150,103	56.7%	+6.89%
Democratic	Matt Heinz	114,401	43.4%	−6.33%
Turnout		264,504		
Republican hold		Swing		

United States Senate elections in Arizona, 2018 (Republican primary, August 28, 2018)
Party	Candidate	Votes	%
Republican	Martha McSally	357,626	54.6%
Republican	Kelli Ward	180,926	27.6%
Republican	Joe Arpaio	116,555	17.8%
Republican	Nicholas Glenn (write-in)	121	0.0%
Republican	William Gonzales (write-in)	70	0.0%
Total votes		655,298	100

United States Senate election in Arizona, 2018
Party	Candidate	Votes	%	±%
Democratic	Kyrsten Sinema	1,191,100	49.97%	
Republican	Martha McSally	1,135,200	47.62%	
Green	Angela Green (withdrawn)	57,442	2.41%	
Turnout		2,383,742	100%	
Democratic gain from Republican		Swing		

United States Senate special election in Arizona, 2020 (Republican primary, August 4, 2020)
Party	Candidate	Votes	%
Republican	Martha McSally (incumbent)	551,401	75.20%
Republican	Daniel McCarthy	181,667	24.77%
Republican	Sean Lyons (write-in)	210	0.03%
Total votes			100

2020 United States Senate Special election in Arizona
Party	Candidate	Votes	%	±%
Democratic	Mark Kelly	1,716,467	51.16%	+10.41%
Republican	Martha McSally (incumbent)	1,637,661	48.81%	−4.90%
Write-in		1,189	0.03%	−0.03%
Total votes		3,355,317	100.0%	
Democratic gain from Republican				

== Personal life ==
McSally was married to Air Force officer Donald Frederick Henry from 1997 to 1999, when the marriage was annulled.

In April 2018, a Tucson man was sentenced to 15 months in prison for threatening to assault and kill McSally.

Also in 2018, McSally said while she was in high school she had been sexually abused.

In 2019, during a congressional hearing, McSally said she was raped by a superior officer while she was in the Air Force, but that she had not reported it.

In November 2023, McSally said she was sexually assaulted on Wednesday the 8th of that month while she was out running in Council Bluffs, Iowa. She said she was groped against her will and reported it to the police. Two days later, Dominic Henton was arrested for this; he was charged with one count of assault with intent to commit sexual abuse.

McSally is a triathlete.

McSally's rescue dog, a Golden Retriever, Boomer, often appears alongside her at events and in videos.

McSally is Protestant.

== See also ==
- Final Report of the Task Force on Combating Terrorist and Foreign Fighter Travel
- Women in the United States House of Representatives
- Women in the United States Senate

U.S. House of Representatives
Preceded by Ron Barber	Member of the U.S. House of Representatives from Arizona's 2nd congressional district 2015–2019	Succeeded by Ann Kirkpatrick
Party political offices
Preceded by Jeff Flake	Republican nominee for U.S. Senator from Arizona (Class 1); 2018	Succeeded by Kari Lake
Preceded by John McCain	Republican nominee for U.S. Senator from Arizona (Class 3); 2020	Succeeded by Blake Masters
U.S. Senate
Preceded by Jon Kyl	U.S. Senator (Class 3) from Arizona; 2019–2020; Served alongside: Kyrsten Sinema	Succeeded by Mark Kelly
U.S. order of precedence (ceremonial)
Preceded by John Walsh as Former U.S. Senator	Order of precedence of the United States; Within Arizona	Succeeded by Fife Symington as Former Governor
Preceded by John Walsh as Former U.S. Senator	Order of precedence of the United States; Outside Arizona	Succeeded by Jack Markell as Former Governor
