= Endangered Wolf Center =

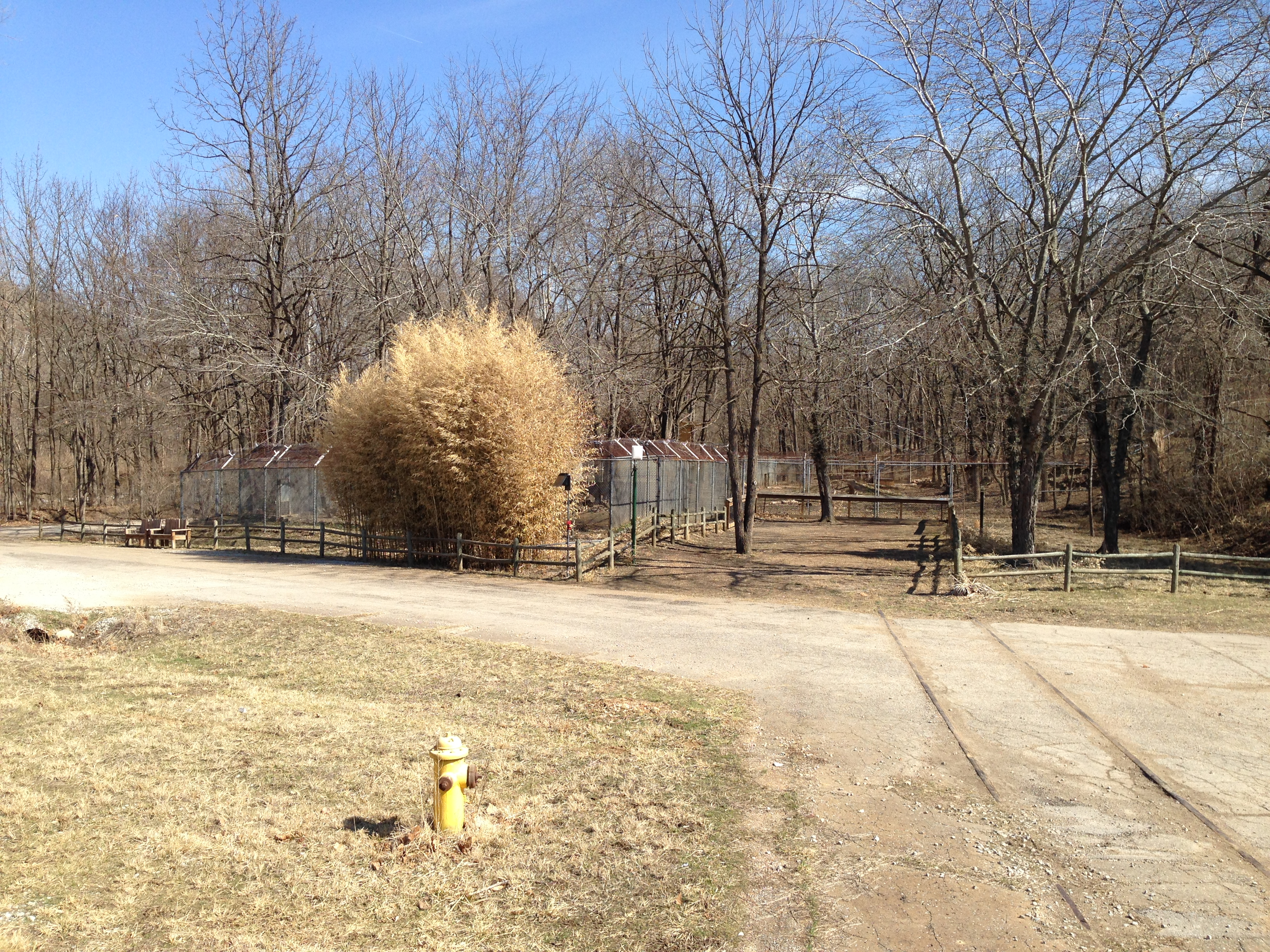
- Interactive map of Endangered Wolf Center
- 38.5155°N 90.5522°W
- Date opened: 1971
- Location: Eureka, Missouri, United States
- Memberships: AZA
- Website: www.endangeredwolfcenter.org

The Endangered Wolf Center is a non-profit wildlife facility in Eureka, Missouri, United States, near St. Louis that is dedicated to preserving and reintroducing to the wild critically endangered species of wolves. It is certified by the Association of Zoos and Aquariums (AZA). Visitors can tour the facility by making a reservation.

The center was founded in 1971 by renowned naturalist Marlin Perkins and his wife Carol, who saw that wolves around the world were in danger of becoming extinct. Its mission is to preserve and protect Mexican wolves, red wolves, and other wild canid species. Their purpose and passion is to carefully manage breeding, reintroduction and inspiring education programs. Animals born at the facility have been reintroduced to North Carolina (red wolves) and Arizona and New Mexico (Mexican wolves). The center's research focuses on reproductive, behavioral, and nutritional needs for the species housed there. The Endangered Wolf Center is a founding member of the AZA's Mexican Wolf and Red Wolf Species Survival Plans. As of August 2026, the center had six species of endangered canids: Mexican wolves, red wolves, maned wolves, African painted dogs, fennec foxes, and swift foxes. It had more than 20 Mexican gray wolves, more than any other managed breeding facility. (Only 286 Mexican wolves were known to exist in the wild as of 2026.) The center serves as the cornerstone of the U.S. Fish and Wildlife Service's program to preserve Mexican wolves and reintroduce them to the wild.

The center offers daytime tours and evening wolf howls. Reservations are required.

The Endangered Wolf Center is an independent 501(c)(3) non-profit and receives no federal or state support. Its programs are supported solely by members, donors and visitors. The center is on the grounds of Washington University in St. Louis' Tyson Research Center. It is located off Interstate 44, 7 miles (11 km) west of Interstate 270 and about 20 miles (32 km) southwest of St. Louis. The Endangered Wolf Center was originally named the Wild Canid Survival and Research Center.

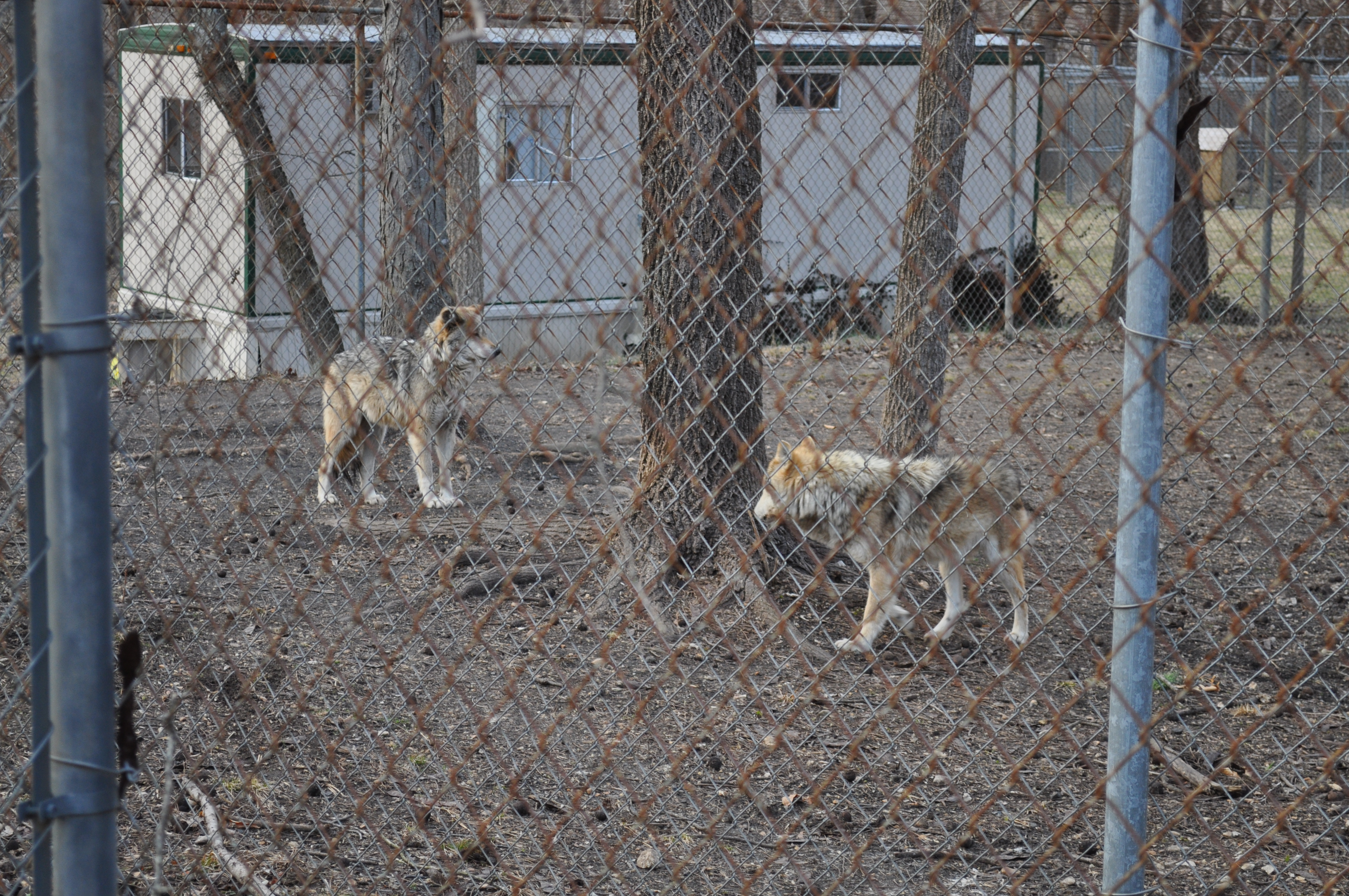
Mexican wolves at the Endangered Wolf Center
