= California Wolf Center =

American nonprofit organization

Coordinates: 33.035159422302655°N 116.5582579993244°W

- Industry: Wildlife conservation
- Founded: 1977
- Headquarters: Julian, California, United States
- Key people: Norm Switzer, Chairman of the Board, Executive Director; Paul Kenis, Founder, Center Historian; Patrick Valentino, Director of Planning and Development; Daniel Moriarty, Secretary
- Website: Official website

California Wolf Center is a 501(c)(3) nonprofit located 50 miles east of San Diego, near the town of Julian, California. It is a conservation, education, and research center dedicated to wolf recovery in the wild. They are a statewide organization with staff and volunteers throughout California striving to pave the way for the return of wolves in California. Founded in 1977 to educate the public about wildlife and ecology, the center is currently home to several packs of gray wolves, some of which play an important role in educational programs. These wolves serve as ambassadors representing wolves in the wild. The center also hosts highly endangered Mexican gray wolves, now being reintroduced into the southwestern United States.

== Mission ==
According to its website, the California Wolf Center's mission is to aid in the recovery of wild populations of wolves, which it does through a combination of conservation, education, and research.

an Image of a Mexican Gray Wolf.

Government-sponsored eradication programs almost wiped out the Mexican wolf in the lower 48 United States. In the mid-1970s, only seven unrelated Mexican wolves were available to start a captive breeding program. Today, as a result of that successful breeding program, there are approximately 83 free-ranging Mexican wolves living in the wild. However, they remain one of the rarest land mammals in North America.

The Center aims to further human understanding of the key role that wolves play a in a healthy ecosystem. The center's goal is to provide the most natural environment for all wolves living at the California Wolf Center, as well as provide information about gray wolves so that people can make informed decisions about the issues that affect humans and wolves.

With the recent decision from the California Wolf Center and their separation of their 2 Mexican Gray Wolves for breeding purposes, the organization is seeking to expand their resources for their care of the Mexican Gray Wolves. The Organization plans on raising 3 million dollars for this project and looks forward towards den expansion and an educational hub.

== The wolves ==
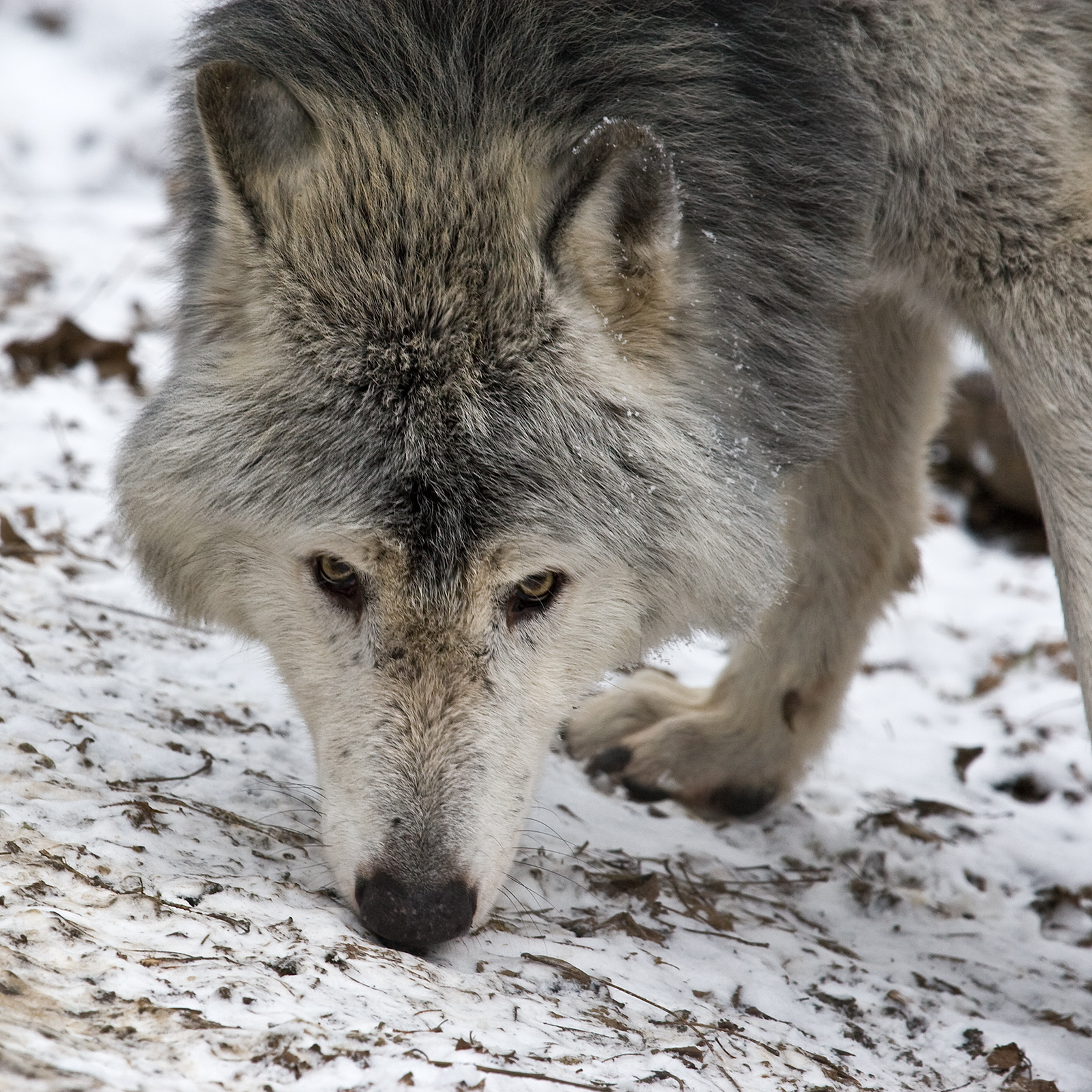
Example of California Wolf

The center is home to a pack of captive Rocky Mountain wolves and several packs of Mexican gray wolves, some of whom may be reintroduced into the southwestern United States. These wolves experience very limited human contact to avoid habituation and to preserve their wild behaviors.

The pack of Rocky Mountain wolves is an intact pack; this allows thousands of visitors each year to observe the social interactions that occur in a captive wolf pack. It also gives students and researchers opportunities to learn about wolf behavior.

The California Wolf Center participates in the Mexican Wolf Species Survival Plan, a bi-national effort to help Mexican gray wolves recover in the wild. Most of the center's Mexican gray wolf packs reside in off-exhibit habitats that help prepare them for potential release into the wild. Retaining their wild nature by keeping them off-exhibit will help them to survive if they are selected for release into the Mexican Wolf Recovery Area in New Mexico and Arizona. The Mexican gray wolves that are least likely to be released are on exhibit during educational programs. This gives visitors the opportunity to view the distinctive physical features of this subspecies of gray wolf.

As of 2026, they are currently facing issues regarding Executive Order 14425 and the removal of both gray wolves and Mexican wolves from the Endangered Species Act. Despite possible complications, the nonprofit remains focused on their care of all their wolves.

== See also ==
- Northwestern wolf
- Mexican wolf
- Captive breeding
- Repopulation of wolves in California
