= Marlin Perkins =

American zoologist (1905–1986)

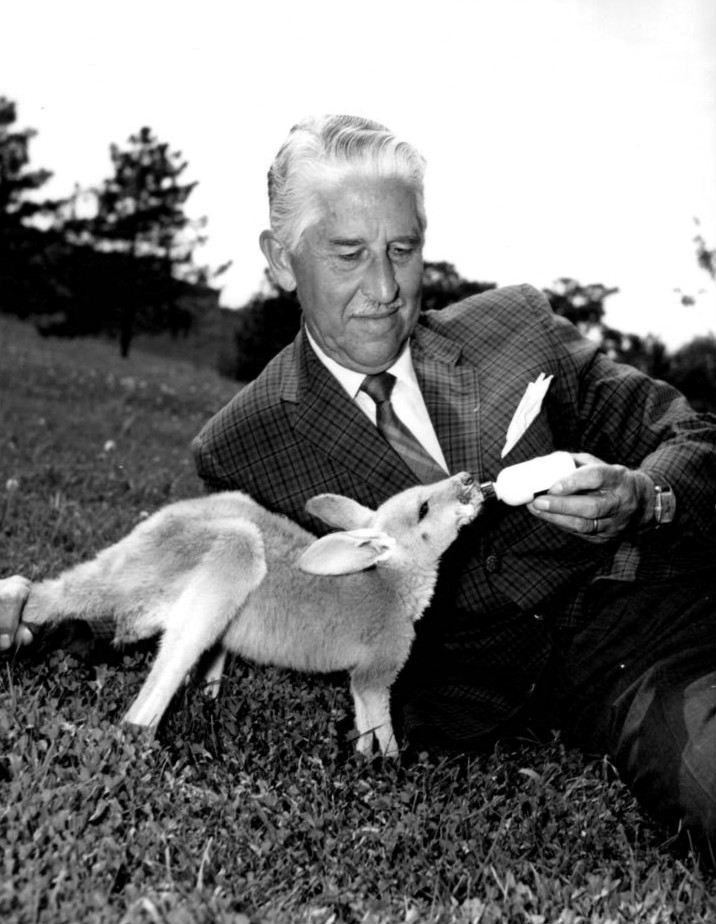
- Perkins bottle-feeding a young kangaroo
- Born: Richard Marlin Perkins; March 28, 1905; Carthage, Missouri, U.S.
- Died: June 14, 1986 (aged 81); St. Louis, Missouri, U.S.
- Burial place: Park Cemetery, Carthage, Missouri
- Occupations: Zoologist, television personality
- Spouse(s): Elise More (1933–1953); Carol Morse Cotsworth (1960–1986, his death)
- Children: 1

Richard Marlin Perkins (March 28, 1905 – June 14, 1986) was an American zoologist. He is best known as the host of the television program Mutual of Omaha's Wild Kingdom from 1963 to 1985.

== Life and career ==
Perkins was born on March 28, 1905, in Carthage, Missouri, the youngest of three sons of Joseph Dudley Perkins and Mynta Mae (née Miller) Perkins. When he was seven years old, his mother nursed him through a serious bout of pneumonia and died of the illness herself. His grieving father sent Marlin's two older brothers to private school, and Marlin was sent to his Aunt Laura's farm in Pittsburg, Kansas. He attended public school there through eighth grade. In the fall of 1919, he entered Wentworth Military Academy. There, Perkins demonstrated his fascination with snakes by keeping North American racers in his room. One afternoon, while exercising them on a lawn at the back of the barracks, he was spotted by a faculty officer and got in trouble for handling them.

Perkins briefly attended the University of Missouri, but quit school to become a laborer at the Saint Louis Zoological Park. He rose through the ranks, becoming the reptile curator in 1928. After being hired as a curator of the Buffalo Zoological Park in Buffalo, New York, Perkins was eventually promoted to director in 1938. He then served as director at the Lincoln Park Zoo in Chicago, Illinois, starting in 1944. In 1957, in a famous case, he sent a snake that was difficult to identify from the zoo to the herpetologist at the Field Museum of Natural History in Chicago, Dr. Karl P. Schmidt. Schmidt carelessly allowed the snake to bite him not believing that its venom would be enough to harm him. The snake was a very deadly boomslang. Schmidt maintained a scientific diary noting his symptoms over the course of the 24 hours in which it took him to die. (The venom is an anticoagulant, causing the person to bleed to death.)

In 1962, Perkins returned to the St. Louis Zoo, this time as director. During his time at the Lincoln Park Zoo, Perkins joined Sir Edmund Hillary as the zoologist for Hillary's 1960 Himalayan expedition to search for the legendary Yeti.

Perkins was the host of Zoo Parade, a television program that originated from the Lincoln Park Zoo on NBC station WNBQ-TV (now WMAQ-TV) when he was the director there. During a rehearsal of Zoo Parade, he was bitten by a timber rattlesnake, one of several bites from venomous snakes Perkins suffered throughout his career (over the years he was also bitten by a cottonmouth and a Gaboon viper). Although the incident occurred during a pre-show rehearsal and was not filmed, it has become something of an urban legend, with many people "remembering" seeing Perkins receive the bite on television (an example of what is known as a "false memory").

As a result of his work on Zoo Parade, Perkins was offered the job in 1963 for which many North Americans remember him: host of the nature show Wild Kingdom. The fame he gained in his television career allowed him to become an advocate for the protection of endangered species, and through Wild Kingdom he gave many Americans their first exposure to the conservation movement. Perkins also helped establish the Wild Canid Survival and Research Center (WCSRC) near St. Louis in 1971. This wolf sanctuary has been instrumental in breeding wolves for eventual re-placement into their natural habitats.

Perkins retired from active zookeeping in 1970 and from Wild Kingdom in 1985 after being diagnosed with cancer. Perkins remained with the Saint Louis Zoo as Director Emeritus until his death from the disease in 1986.

== Honors ==
Perkins received an American Education Award in 1974. He was also granted honorary doctoral degrees from the then University of Missouri in Columbia, Missouri; Northland College in Ashland, Wisconsin; Rockhurst College in Kansas City, Missouri; MacMurray College in Jacksonville, Illinois; and the College of Saint Mary in Omaha, Nebraska.

In 1990, Perkins was inducted into the St. Louis Walk of Fame. A statue of Perkins also stands in Central Park in his hometown of Carthage, Missouri.

== Personal life ==
Perkins married his first wife, Elise More, in 1933; they were divorced in 1953. Their daughter, Suzanne, was born in 1937. Perkins married his second wife, Carol Morse Cotsworth, in 1960; they remained married until his death. Perkins died on June 14, 1986, from lymphatic cancer.

== Publications ==
Listed chronologically

- Perkins, Marlin (1944). Animal Faces. Buffalo, New York: Foster & Stewart.
- Perkins, Marlin (1954). Animal Tracks. Harrisburg: Stackpole Books. LCCN 54-8680.
- Perkins, Marlin (1954). Marlin Perkins' Zooparade. Rand McNally & Company. ASIN B000MJDONO. LCCN 54-8900.
- Perkins, Marlin; Perkins, Carol Morse (1966). I Saw You from Afar: A Visit to the Bushmen of the Kalahari Desert. New York: Antheneum. ASIN B0000CN63K.
- Perkins, Marlin (1976). Guide to Animal Tracks. Harrisburg: Stackpole Books. ISBN 0811722546.
- Perkins, Marlin (1982). My Wild Kingdom: An Autobiography. New York: E. P. Dutton. ISBN 9780525241461. OCLC 8389333.
