= Hunting behavior of gray wolves =

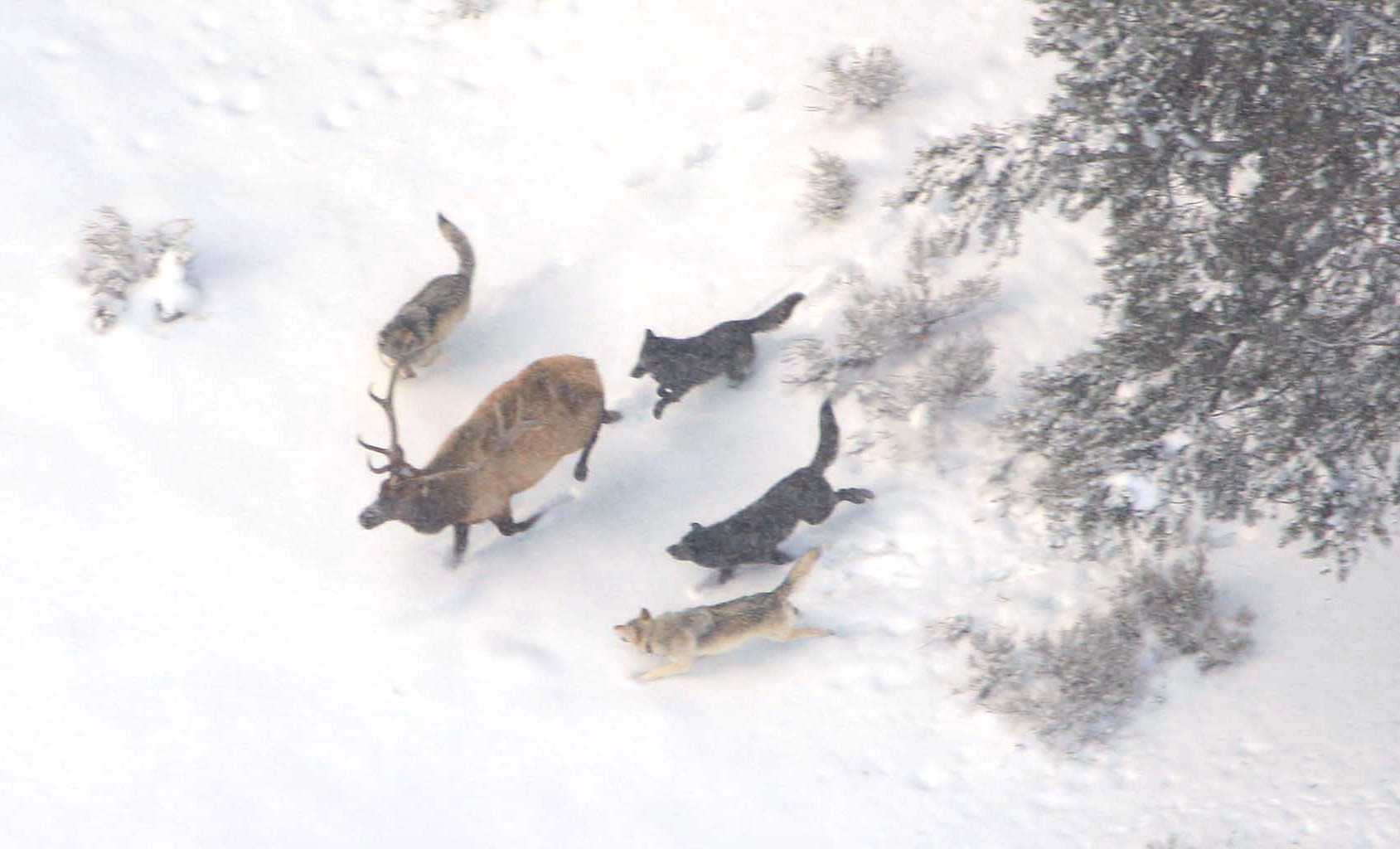
Northwestern wolves pursuing a bull elk

Single wolves or mated pairs typically have higher success rates in hunting than do large packs; single wolves have occasionally been observed to kill large prey such as moose, bison and muskoxen unaided. This contrasts with the commonly held belief that larger packs benefit from cooperative hunting to bring down large game. The size of a wolf hunting pack is related to the number of pups that survived the previous winter, adult survival, and the rate of dispersing wolves leaving the pack. The optimal pack size for hunting elk is four wolves, and for bison a large pack size is more successful.

As well as their physical adaptations for hunting hoofed mammals, wolves possess certain behavioural, cognitive, and psychological adaptations to assist with their hunting lifestyle. Wolves are excellent learners that match or outperform domestic dogs. They can use gaze to focus attention on where other wolves are looking. This is important because wolves do not use vocalization when hunting. In laboratory tests, they appear to exhibit insight, foresight, understanding, and the ability to plan. To survive, wolves must be able to solve two problems—finding a prey animal, then confronting it.

== Tracking ==
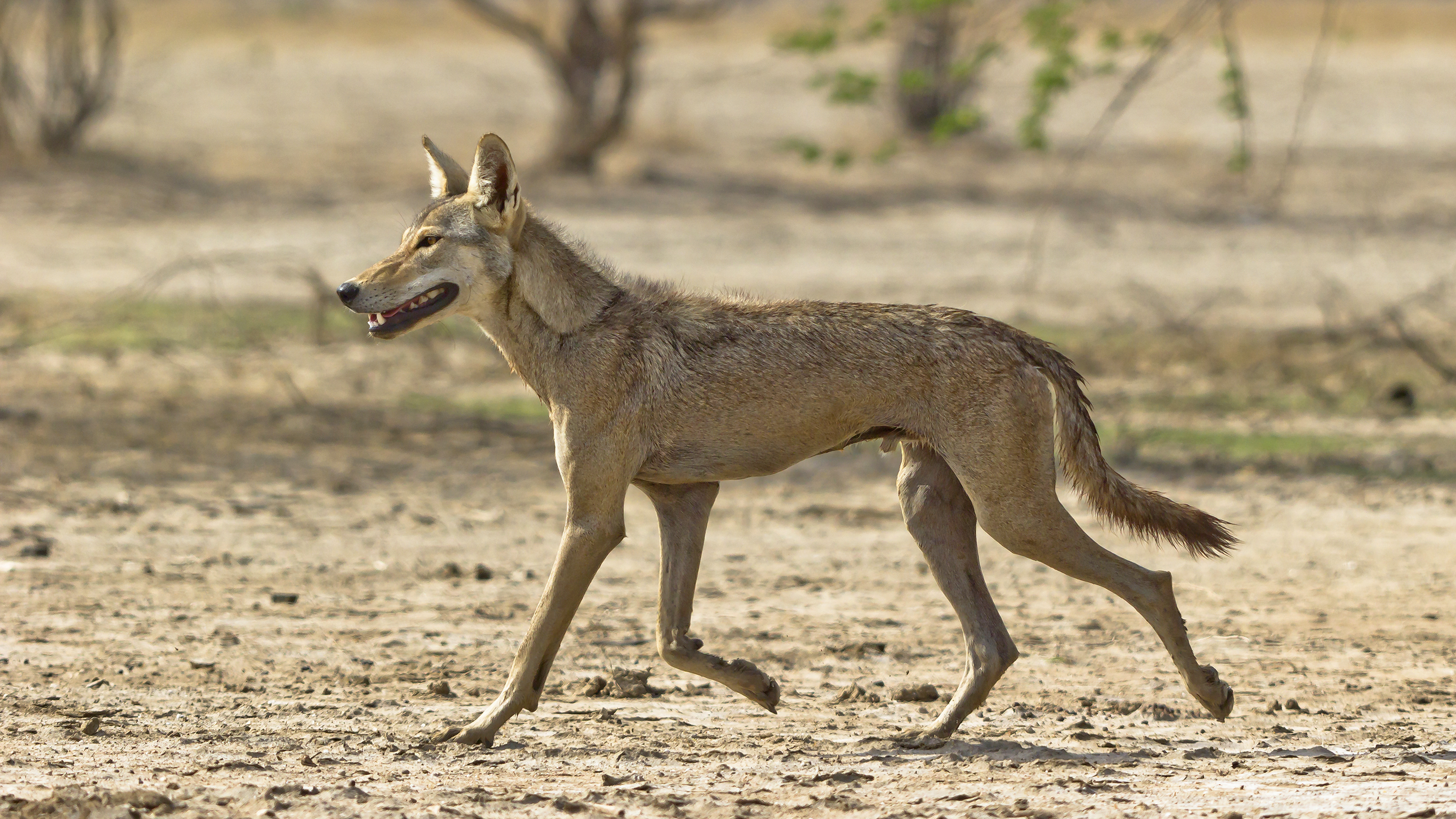
An Indian wolf trotting at Blackbuck National Park

Wolves move around their territory when hunting, using the same trails for extended periods. After snowfalls, wolves find their old trails and continue using them. These follow the banks of rivers, the shorelines of lakes, and ravines overgrown with shrubs, plantations, roads, and human paths. Wolves are nocturnal predators. During the winter, a pack will commence hunting in the twilight or early evening and will hunt all night, traveling tens of kilometers. Sometimes hunting large prey occurs during the day. During the summer, wolves generally tend to hunt individually, ambushing their prey and rarely giving pursuit.

The wolf usually travels at a loping pace, placing one of its paws directly in front of the other. This gait can be maintained for hours at a rate of 8–9 km/h (5.0–5.6 mph). On bare paths, a wolf can quickly achieve speeds of 50–60 km/h (31–37 mph). The wolf has a running gait of 55–70 km/h (34–43 mph), can leap 5 m (16 ft) horizontally in a single bound, and can maintain rapid pursuit for at least 20 minutes. A wolf's foot is large and flexible, which allows it to tread on a wide variety of terrain. A wolf's legs are long compared to their body size allowing them to travel up to 76 km (47 mi) in 12 hours. This adaptation allows wolves to locate prey within hours, but it can take days to find prey that can be killed without great risk. Moose and deer live singly in the summer. Caribou live in herds of thousands which presents dangers for wolves. Elk live in small herds and these are a safer target.

A wolf carries its head at the same level as its back, lifting it only when alert. In one study, wolves detected moose using scent ten times, vision six times, and once by following tracks in the snow. Their vision is as good as a human's, and they can smell prey at least 2.4 km (1 1/2 mi) away. One wolf traveled to a herd 103 km (64 mi) away. A human can detect the smell of a forest fire over the same distance from downwind. The wolf's sense of smell is at least comparable to that of the domestic dog, which is at least ten thousand times more sensitive than a human's.

== Pursuit ==
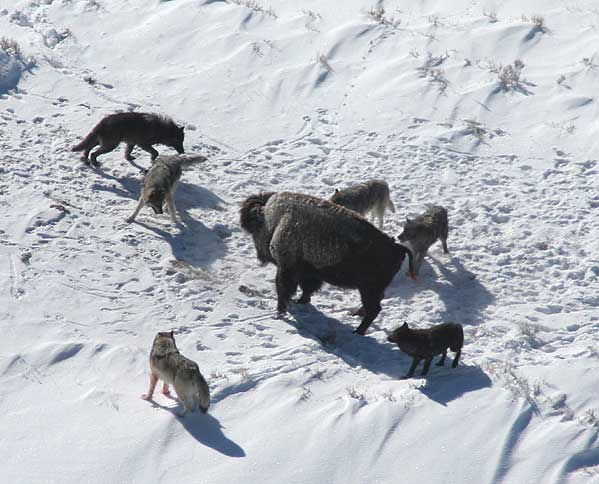
Bison, elk, and moose usually stand their ground against a pack of wolves

When hunting large gregarious prey, wolves will try to isolate an individual from its group. If successful, a wolf pack can bring down a game that will feed it for days, but one error in judgment can lead to serious injury or death. Most large prey have developed defensive adaptations and behaviors. Wolves have been killed while attempting to bring down bison, elk, moose, muskoxen, and even by one of their smallest hoofed prey, the white-tailed deer. In one rare event, a female moose killed two adult male wolves in a single event. With smaller prey like beaver, geese, and hares, there is no risk to the wolf. Although people often believe wolves can easily overcome any of their prey, their success rate in hunting hoofed prey is usually low.

Generally, bison, elk, and moose will stand their ground, then the wolves must struggle with them to bring them down. Often caribou and deer will flee, but sometimes deer also make a stand. If the targeted animal stands its ground, wolves either ignore it or try to intimidate it into running. Wolves, or even a wolf on its own, will attempt to frighten a herd into panicking and dispersing.

When wolves encounter prey that flees, they give chase. The speed of sprinting prey is closely related to the speed of their main predators. Wolves can run at 56–64 km/h (35–40 mph) across several kilometers and will often pursue prey for at least 1 km (0.62 mi). One wolf chased a caribou for 8 km (5 mi), another chased and tracked a deer for 20 km (12 mi), and one 11-year-old wolf chased and caught an Arctic hare after seven minutes. Most wolf prey will try to run to water, where they will either escape or be better placed to attempt to ward off the wolves.

=== Disablement ===
The wolf must give chase and gain on its fleeing prey, slow it down by biting through thick hair and hide, and then disable it enough to begin feeding. After chasing and then confronting a large prey animal, the wolf makes use of its 6 cm (2 1/2 in) fangs and its powerful masseter muscles to deliver a bite force of 28 kg/cm^{2} (400 lbf/in^{2}), which is capable of breaking open the skulls of many of its prey animals. The wolf leaps at its quarry and tears at it. One wolf was observed being dragged for dozens of meters attached to the hind leg of a moose; another was seen being dragged over a fallen log while attached to a bull elk's nose.

The most common point of wolf attacks on moose is the upper hind legs. Hind leg wounds are inflicted from the rear, midway up the hock with the canine teeth. These leave gaping skin perforations over 4 cm (1 1/2 in) in diameter. Although blood loss, muscle damage, and tendon exposure may occur, there is no evidence of hamstringing. Attacks also occur on the fleshy nose, the back and sides of the neck, the ears, and the perineum. Wolves may wound large prey and then lie around resting for hours before killing it when it is weaker due to blood loss, thereby lessening the risk of injury to themselves.

With medium-sized prey, such as roe deer or sheep, wolves kill by biting the throat, severing nerve tracks and the carotid artery, thus causing the animal to die within a few seconds to a minute. With small, mouselike prey, wolves leap in a high arc and immobilize it with their forepaws. When prey is vulnerable and abundant, wolves may occasionally surplus kill. Such instances are common with domestic animals but rare with wild prey. In the wild, surplus killing occurs primarily during late winter or spring, when snow is unusually deep (thus impeding the movements of prey) or during the denning period, when den-bound wolves require a ready supply of meat. Medium-sized prey are especially vulnerable to surplus killing, as the swift throat-biting method allows wolves to kill one animal quickly and move on to another.

== Feeding ==
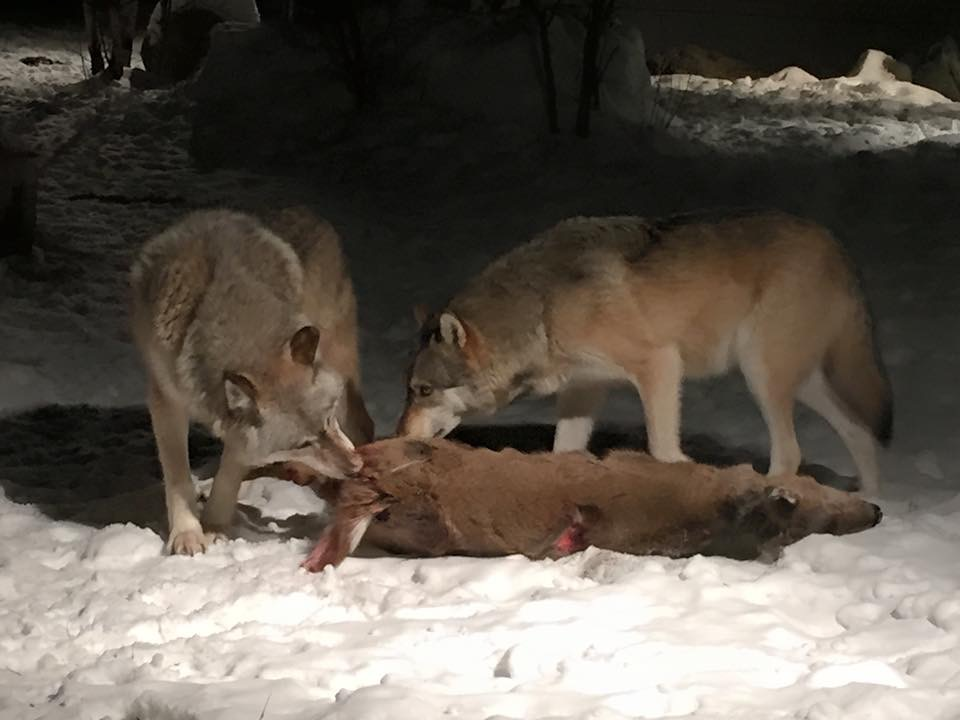
Two wolves feeding on a white-tailed deer

Once prey is brought down, wolves begin to feed excitedly, ripping and tugging at the carcass in all directions, and bolting down large chunks of it. The breeding pair typically monopolizes food to continue producing pups. When food is scarce, this is done at the expense of other family members, especially non-pups. The breeding pair typically eats first. They usually work the hardest at killing prey, and may rest after a long hunt and allow the rest of the family to eat undisturbed. Once the breeding pair has finished eating, the rest of the family tears off pieces of the carcass and transports them to secluded areas where they can eat in peace. Wolves typically commence feeding by consuming the larger internal organs, like the heart, liver, lungs, and stomach lining. The kidneys and spleen are eaten once they are exposed, followed by the muscles. A wolf can eat 15–19% of its body weight in a single feeding.
