= Tom Hanafan =

American politician

Mayor of Council Bluffs
- In office January 4, 1988 – January 2, 2014
- Succeeded by: Matt Walsh

Personal details
- Party: Democratic
- Education: University of South Dakota

Tom P. Hanafan is the former mayor of Council Bluffs, Iowa and is a past president of the Iowa League of Cities.

== Education ==
Hanafan graduated from Thomas Jefferson High School. While in high school, he played football and baseball and worked a number of different jobs including delivering newspapers, cleaning windows and cleaning an ice cream truck. After graduating high school, he received a scholarship to football at the University of South Dakota. During the summer, he would go back home to work for his dad at the Union Pacific Railroad in Omaha.

== Family ==
Hanafan is the son of Robert and Evelyn Hanafan. He has two sisters, Nancy and Barbara, and a younger brother, Mike. In 1969, he married his wife Shirley.

== Legacy ==
Hanafan is memorialised in the Tom Hanafan River’s Edge Park in Council Bluffs, Iowa, along the Missouri River at the foot of the Bob Kerrey Pedestrian Bridge, directly across from downtown Omaha, Nebraska.

== See also ==
- List of mayors of Council Bluffs, Iowa
