= List of zoos in the United States =

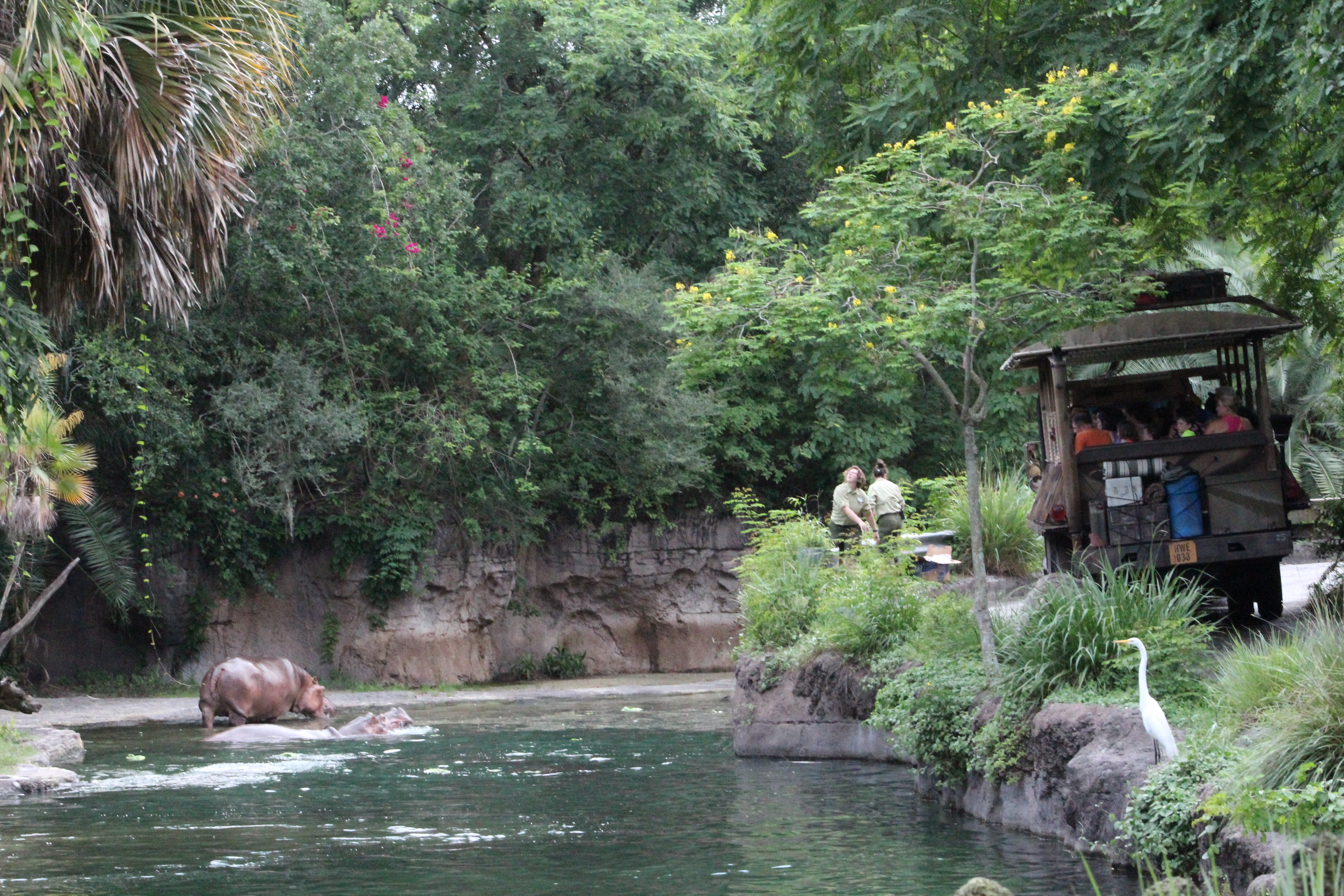
Disney's Animal Kingdom in Bay Lake, Florida, the most-visited zoo in the U.S. with over 10 million visitors annually

This is an incomplete list of zoos in the United States. For a list of aquaria, see the list of aquaria in the United States, and for a list of nature centers, see the list of nature centers in the United States.

Zoos are primarily terrestrial facilities where animals are held in enclosures and displayed to the public for education and entertainment. Animals may be bred, as well, to maintain captive populations and kept under veterinary care. These facilities include zoos, safari parks, animal theme parks, aviaries, butterfly zoos, reptile centers, and petting zoos, as well as wildlife sanctuaries and nature reserves where visitors are allowed.

== Alabama ==
- Alabama Gulf Coast Zoo, Gulf Shores
- Alabama Wildlife Center, Pelham
- Birmingham Zoo, Birmingham
- Montgomery Zoo, Montgomery

== Alaska ==
- Alaska Raptor Center, Sitka
- Alaska Wildlife Conservation Center, Portage
- Alaska Zoo, Anchorage
- Fortress of the Bear, Sitka

== Arizona ==
- Arizona-Sonora Desert Museum, Tucson
- Bearizona, Williams
- Heritage Park Zoological Sanctuary, Prescott
- Navajo Nation Zoological and Botanical Park, Window Rock
- Out of Africa Wildlife Park, Camp Verde
- Phoenix Zoo, Phoenix
- Reid Park Zoo, Tucson
- Wildlife World Zoo, Litchfield Park

== Arkansas ==
- Arkansas Alligator Farm and Petting Zoo, Hot Springs
- Little Rock Zoo, Little Rock
- Turpentine Creek Wildlife Refuge, Eureka Springs

== California ==
- Big Bear Alpine Zoo, Big Bear Lake
- California Living Museum, Bakersfield
- California Science Center, Los Angeles
- California Wolf Center, Julian
- Charles Paddock Zoo, Atascadero
- CuriOdyssey, San Mateo
- Folsom City Zoo Sanctuary, Folsom
- Fresno Chaffee Zoo, Fresno
- Happy Hollow Park & Zoo, San Jose
- Living Coast Discovery Center, Chula Vista
- Living Desert Zoo and Gardens, Palm Desert
- Los Angeles Zoo, Los Angeles
- Micke Grove Zoo, Lodi
- Oakland Zoo, Oakland
- Orange County Zoo, Orange
- Palo Alto Junior Museum and Zoo, Palo Alto
- Performing Animal Welfare Society, Galt
- Sacramento Zoo, Sacramento
- Safari West, Santa Rosa
- San Diego Zoo, San Diego
- San Diego Zoo Safari Park, Escondido
- San Francisco Zoo, San Francisco
- Santa Ana Zoo, Santa Ana
- Santa Barbara Zoo, Santa Barbara
- Sequoia Park Zoo, Eureka
- Shambala Preserve, Acton, California
- Six Flags Discovery Kingdom, Vallejo
- The Reptile Zoo, Fountain Valley
- Turtle Bay Exploration Park, Redding
- Ventana Wildlife Society, Salinas
- Wildlife WayStation, Sylmar
- William S. Hart Regional Park

== Colorado ==
- Butterfly Pavilion, Westminster
- Cheyenne Mountain Zoo, Colorado Springs
- Colorado Gators Reptile Park, Mosca
- Denver Zoo, Denver
- Nature and Wildlife Discovery Center, Pueblo
- Pueblo Zoo, Pueblo
- The Wild Animal Sanctuary, Keenesburg

== Connecticut ==
- Connecticut's Beardsley Zoo, Bridgeport
- Sharon Audubon Center, Sharon

== Delaware ==
- Brandywine Zoo, Wilmington

== District of Columbia ==
- National Zoological Park, Washington, D.C.

== Florida ==
- Big Cat Rescue, Tampa
- Brevard Zoo, Melbourne
- Busch Gardens Tampa Bay, Tampa
- Calusa Nature Center and Planetarium, Fort Myers
- Central Florida Zoo and Botanical Gardens, Sanford
- Center for Great Apes, Wauchula
- Disney's Animal Kingdom, Bay Lake
- Emerald Coast Wildlife Refuge, Navarre
- Everglades Alligator Farm, Homestead
- Flamingo Gardens, Fort Lauderdale
- Gatorland, Orlando
- Gatorama, Palmdale
- Gulf Breeze Zoo, Woodlawn Beach
- Homosassa Springs Wildlife State Park, Homosassa Springs
- Jacksonville Zoo and Gardens, Jacksonville
- Jungle Island, Miami
- Lemur Conservation Foundation, Myakka City
- Lion Country Safari, Loxahatchee
- Lubee Bat Conservancy, Gainesville
- Monkey Jungle, Miami
- Naples Zoo, Naples
- Palm Beach Zoo, West Palm Beach
- Reptile World Serpentarium, St. Cloud
- Santa Fe College Teaching Zoo, Gainesville
- Sarasota Jungle Gardens, Sarasota
- Save the Chimps, Fort Pierce
- St. Augustine Alligator Farm Zoological Park, St. Augustine Beach
- Tallahassee Museum, Tallahassee, Florida
- The National Elephant Center, Fellsmere
- Zoo Miami, Miami
- ZooTampa at Lowry Park, Tampa

== Georgia ==
- Center for Wildlife Education, Statesboro
- Chehaw Park, Albany
- Noah's Ark Animal Sanctuary, Locust Grove
- Wild Adventures, Valdosta
- Zoo Atlanta, Atlanta

== Hawaii ==
- Honolulu Zoo, Honolulu
- Pana'ewa Rainforest Zoo, Hilo

== Idaho ==
- Zoo Idaho, Pocatello
- Zoo Boise, Boise
- World Center for Birds of Prey, Boise
- Yellowstone Bear World, Rexburg

== Illinois ==
- Brookfield Zoo Chicago, Brookfield
- Cosley Zoo, Wheaton
- Henson Robinson Zoo, Springfield
- Lincoln Park Zoo, Chicago
- Miller Park Zoo, Bloomington
- Niabi Zoo, Coal Valley
- Peoria Zoo, Peoria
- Phillips Park Zoo, Aurora
- Santa's Village AZoosment Park, East Dundee
- Scovill Zoo, Decatur
- Wildlife Prairie Park, Hanna City

== Indiana ==
- Black Pine Animal Sanctuary, Albion
- Columbian Park Zoo, Lafayette
- Exotic Feline Rescue Center, Center Point
- Fort Wayne Zoo, Fort Wayne
- Indianapolis Zoo, Indianapolis
- Mesker Park Zoo, Evansville
- Potawatomi Zoo, South Bend
- Stapp's Circle S Ranch, Greensburg
- Washington Park Zoo, Michigan City
- Wolf Park, Battle Ground

== Iowa ==
- Ape Cognition and Conservation Initiative, Des Moines
- Blank Park Zoo, Des Moines

== Kansas ==
- Cedar Cove Feline Conservatory & Sanctuary, Louisburg
- David Traylor Zoo of Emporia, Emporia
- Great Bend Zoo, Great Bend
- Hutchinson Zoo, Hutchinson
- Lee Richardson Zoo, Garden City
- Maxwell Wildlife Refuge, Canton
- Rolling Hills Zoo, Salina
- Sedgwick County Zoo, Wichita
- Sunset Zoo, Manhattan
- Topeka Zoo, Topeka

== Kentucky ==
- Kentucky Down Under, Horse Cave
- Kentucky Reptile Zoo, Slade
- Louisville Zoo, Louisville
- Primate Rescue Center, Nicholasville

== Louisiana ==
- Alexandria Zoological Park, Alexandria
- Audubon Insectarium, New Orleans
- Audubon Zoo, New Orleans
- Baton Rouge Zoo, Baton Rouge
- Chimp Haven, Keithville
- Global Wildlife Center, Folsom
- Louisiana Purchase Gardens and Zoo, Monroe

== Maryland ==
- Catoctin Wildlife Preserve and Zoo, Thurmont
- The Maryland Zoo in Baltimore, Baltimore
- Plumpton Park Zoo, Rising Sun
- Salisbury Zoo, Salisbury

== Massachusetts ==
- Buttonwood Park Zoo, New Bedford
- Capron Park Zoo, Attleboro
- EcoTarium, Worcester
- Franklin Park Zoo, Boston
- Lupa Zoo, Ludlow
- Museum of Science, Boston
- Southwick's Zoo, Mendon
- Stone Zoo, Stoneham
- The Zoo in Forest Park, Springfield

== Michigan ==
- Binder Park Zoo, Battle Creek
- Saginaw Children's Zoo, Saginaw
- Detroit Zoo, Royal Oak
- DeYoung Family Zoo, Wallace
- John Ball Zoological Garden, Grand Rapids
- Potter Park Zoo, Lansing
- Roscommon Zoo, Roscommon

== Minnesota ==
- Como Park Zoo and Conservatory, Saint Paul
- Hemker Park & Zoo, Freeport
- Lake Superior Zoo, Duluth
- Minnesota Zoo, Apple Valley
- Zollman Zoo, near Byron (a part of Oxbow Park)

== Mississippi ==
- Collins Zoo, Collins
- Hattiesburg Zoo, Hattiesburg
- Jackson Zoo, Jackson
- Mississippi Museum of Natural Science, Jackson
- Tupelo Buffalo Park and Zoo, Tupelo

== Missouri ==
- Dickerson Park Zoo, Springfield
- Endangered Wolf Center, Ellisville
- Grant's Farm, St. Louis
- Kansas City Zoo, Kansas City
- Saint Louis Zoo, St. Louis
- Wonders of Wildlife Museum & Aquarium, Springfield

== Montana ==
- Grizzly & Wolf Discovery Center, West Yellowstone
- Yellowstone Wildlife Sanctuary, Red Lodge
- ZooMontana, Billings

== Nebraska ==
- Lee G. Simmons Conservation Park and Wildlife Safari, Ashland
- Lincoln Children's Zoo, Lincoln
- Omaha's Henry Doorly Zoo and Aquarium, Omaha
- Riverside Discovery Center, Scottsbluff

== New Hampshire ==
- Santa's Village, Jefferson
- Squam Lakes Natural Science Center, Holderness

== New Jersey ==
- Bergen County Zoological Park, Paramus
- Cape May County Park & Zoo, Cape May Court House
- Cohanzick Zoo, Bridgeton
- Liberty Science Center, Jersey City
- Popcorn Park Animal Refuge, Forked River
- Six Flags Great Adventure, Jackson Township
- Space Farms Zoo and Museum, Beemerville
- Turtle Back Zoo, West Orange

== New Mexico ==
- ABQ BioPark Zoo, Albuquerque
- Alameda Park Zoo, Alamogordo
- Living Desert Zoo and Gardens State Park, Carlsbad
- Wildlife West Nature Park, Edgewood
- Wild Spirit Wolf Sanctuary, Ramah

== New York ==
- Bear Mountain State Park, Stony Point
- Bronx Zoo, New York City (The Bronx)
- Buffalo Zoo, Buffalo
- Central Park Zoo, New York City (Manhattan)
- Long Island Game Farm, Manorville
- Zoo New York, Watertown
- Prospect Park Zoo, New York City (Brooklyn)
- Queens Zoo, New York City (Queens)
- Ross Park Zoo, Binghamton
- Rosamond Gifford Zoo, Syracuse
- Seneca Park Zoo, Rochester
- Staten Island Zoo, New York City (Staten Island)
- Trevor Zoo, Millbrook
- Utica Zoo, Utica

== North Carolina ==
- Carolina Tiger Rescue, Pittsboro
- Conservators Center, Burlington
- Duke University Lemur Center, Durham
- Greensboro Science Center, Greensboro
- Museum of Life and Science, Durham
- North Carolina Zoo, Asheboro
- Tregembo Animal Park, Wilmington
- Western North Carolina Nature Center, Asheville

== North Dakota ==
- Chahinkapa Zoo, Wahpeton
- Dakota Zoo, Bismarck
- Red River Zoo, Fargo
- Roosevelt Park Zoo, Minot

== Ohio ==
- African Safari Wildlife Park, Port Clinton
- Akron Zoo, Akron
- Boonshoft Museum of Discovery, Dayton
- Cincinnati Zoo and Botanical Garden, Cincinnati
- Cleveland Metroparks Zoo, Cleveland
- Columbus Zoo and Aquarium, Columbus
- Heaven's Corner, West Alexandria
- Toledo Zoo, Toledo
- The Wilds, Cumberland

== Oklahoma ==
- Greater Wynnewood Exotic Animal Park, Wynnewood
- Oklahoma City Zoo and Botanical Garden, Oklahoma City
- Tulsa Zoo and Living Museum, Tulsa

== Oregon ==
- Cascades Raptor Center, Eugene
- Great Cats World Park, Cave Junction
- Oregon Zoo, Portland
- West Coast Game Park Safari, Bandon
- Wildlife Safari, Winston

== Pennsylvania ==
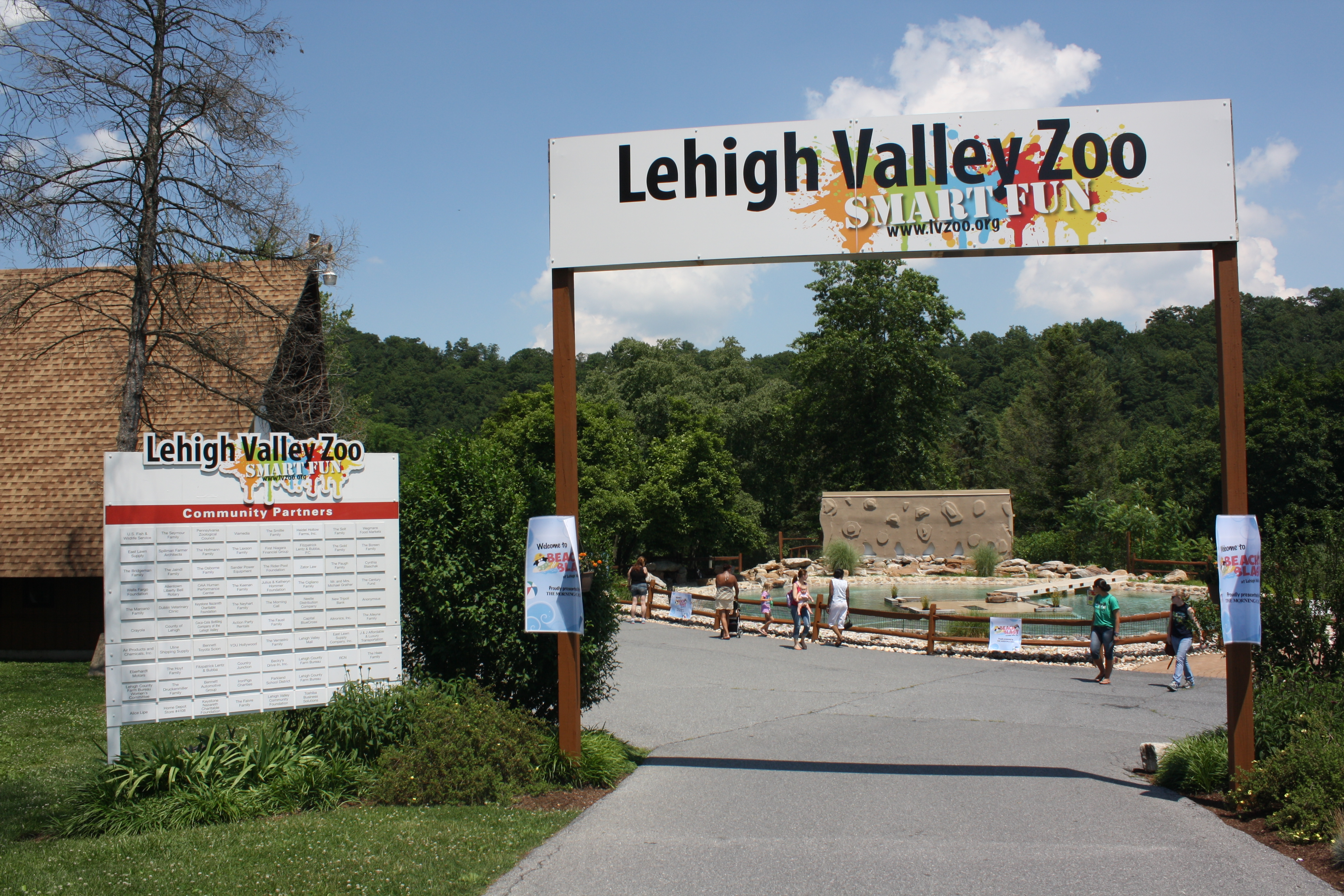
The entrance to Lehigh Valley Zoo in Schnecksville, Pennsylvania, U.S.

- Elmwood Park Zoo, Norristown
- Erie Zoo, Erie
- Lehigh Valley Zoo, Schnecksville
- National Aviary, Pittsburgh
- Philadelphia Zoo, Philadelphia
- Pittsburgh Zoo & Aquarium, Pittsburgh
- ZooAmerica, Hershey

== Rhode Island ==
- Roger Williams Park Zoo, Providence

== South Carolina ==
- Brookgreen Gardens, Murrells Inlet
- Charles Towne Landing, Charleston
- Greenville Zoo, Greenville
- HollyWild Animal Park, Inman
- Myrtle Beach Safari, Myrtle Beach
- Reptile Lagoon, Dillon
- Riverbanks Zoo, Columbia

== South Dakota ==
- Bear Country USA, Rapid City
- Bramble Park Zoo, Watertown
- Great Plains Zoo and Delbridge Museum, Sioux Falls
- Reptile Gardens, Rapid City

== Tennessee ==
- Chattanooga Zoo at Warner Park, Chattanooga
- Memphis Zoo, Memphis
- Nashville Zoo at Grassmere, Nashville
- Tiger Haven, Kingston
- The Elephant Sanctuary, Hohenwald
- Zoo Knoxville, Knoxville

== Texas ==
- Abilene Zoological Gardens, Abilene
- Alveus Sanctuary, Austin
- Austin Zoo, Austin
- Caldwell Zoo, Tyler
- Cameron Park Zoo, Waco
- Dallas Zoo, Dallas
- El Paso Zoo, El Paso
- Ellen Trout Zoo, Lufkin
- Fort Worth Zoo, Fort Worth
- Fossil Rim Wildlife Center, Glen Rose
- Frank Buck Zoo, Gainesville
- Gladys Porter Zoo, Brownsville
- Houston Zoo, Houston
- Moody Gardens, Galveston
- Natural Bridge Wildlife Ranch, New Braunfels
- San Antonio Zoo, San Antonio
- Wonder World, San Marcos

== Utah ==
- Tracy Aviary, Salt Lake City
- Utah's Hogle Zoo, Salt Lake City
- Wild Kingdom Train Zoo, Farmington

== Virginia ==
- Bluebird Gap Farm, Hampton
- Busch Gardens Williamsburg, Williamsburg
- Maymont, Richmond
- Metro Richmond Zoo, Richmond
- Mill Mountain Zoo, Roanoke
- NOVA Wild, Reston
- Virginia Living Museum, Newport News
- Virginia Zoological Park, Norfolk

== Washington ==
- Cat Tales Zoological Park, Spokane
- Cougar Mountain Zoo, Issaquah
- Northwest Trek, Eatonville
- Point Defiance Zoo & Aquarium, Tacoma
- Woodland Park Zoo, Seattle

== West Virginia ==
- Hovatter's Wildlife Zoo, Kingwood
- Oglebay Good Zoo, Wheeling
- West Virginia State Wildlife Center, French Creek

== Wisconsin ==
- Bay Beach Wildlife Sanctuary, Green Bay
- Henry Vilas Zoo, Madison
- International Crane Foundation, Baraboo
- Irvine Park Zoo, Chippewa Falls
- Kewaunee County Bruemmer Park and Zoo
- Lincoln Park Zoo, Manitowoc
- Menominee Park Zoo, Oshkosh
- Milwaukee County Zoo, Milwaukee
- Northeastern Wisconsin Zoo, Green Bay
- Racine Zoo, Racine
- Wilderness Walk, Hayward

== See also ==
- List of AZA member zoos and aquaria
- List of aquaria in the United States
- List of nature centers in the United States
- List of WAZA member zoos and aquariums
- List of zoos by country
