= Stapp =

Stapp may refer to

- Stapp (surname)
- Stapp's ironical paradox by Colonel John Paul Stapp
- Stapp, Oklahoma, an unincorporated community in the U.S.
- Leive, Parks and Stapp Opera House in Indiana, U.S.
- Stapp's Circle S Ranch in Indiana, U.S.
