= Wild Animal Park =

Wild Animal Park may refer to:

- San Diego Zoo Safari Park, formerly known as the San Diego Wild Animal Park, near Escondido, California
- Whipsnade Wild Animal Park, in Bedfordshire, England
- South Lakes Safari Zoo (Formerly South Lakes Wild Animal Park), near Barrow-in-Furness, Cumbria, England
- Wild Animal Park (Chittenango), in Chittenango, New York
- Port Lympne Wild Animal Park, near Hythe, Kent, England
- Howletts Wild Animal Park, in Bekesbourne, England

== See also ==
- HollyWild Animal Park, in Wellford, South Carolina
- Zoo
