= Warner Park (disambiguation) =

Warner Park is a community park on the northeast side of Madison, Wisconsin.

Warner Park may also refer to:

- Warner Park Sporting Complex, a sporting stadium in Saint Kitts and Nevis
- Percy and Edwin Warner Parks, comprising the Warner Park Historic District in Davidson and Williamson County, Tennessee

== See also ==
- Werner Park
- Chattanooga Zoo at Warner Park
