= Bear Country =

Bear Country may refer to:

- Bear Country (Disneyland), a themed land at Disneyland
- Bear Country (film), a 1953 American short documentary film
- Bear Country USA, a wildlife park in South Dakota, United States
- Bear Country, a fictional country in the Berenstain Bears
- Bear Country, the former name of a wrestling tag team currently competing in All Elite Wrestling as Iron Savages
- The Get Out, a 2026 American film directed by Derrick Borte, with the working title Bear Country
