= Santa Ana Zoo =

Zoo in Santa Ana, California, United States

- Interactive map of Santa Ana Zoo
- 33°44′38.094″N 117°50′33.11″W
- Date opened: Saturday March 8, 1952
- Location: 1801 East Chestnut Avenue, Santa Ana, California, United States
- Land area: 20 acres (8.1 ha)
- No. of animals: 250
- Annual visitors: 270,000
- Major exhibits: River's Edge, Colors of the Amazon Aviary, Crean Family Farm, Monkey Row, Tierra de las Pampas
- Website: www.santaanazoo.org

The Santa Ana Zoo at Prentice Park in Santa Ana, California, is a 20-acre (8.1 ha) zoo focusing on the animals and plants of Central and South America. The Santa Ana Zoo hosts more than 270,000 people annually. The zoo opened Saturday March 8, 1952 and is owned and operated by the City of Santa Ana. Joseph Prentice donated land for the zoo with the stipulation that the city must keep at least 50 monkeys at all times. The zoo maintains an extensive primate collection with over a dozen species from around the world.

The focus of the Santa Ana Zoo is recreation, education, and conservation. It is accredited by the Association of Zoos and Aquariums (AZA).

== History ==
Joseph Edward Prentice bought the 19.23-acre (7.78 ha) site. He donated 16 acres (6.5 ha) to the city of Santa Ana in 1949 and stipulated that the zoo have at least fifty monkeys at all times. Construction of the zoo began that year, and it opened on March 8, 1952. A children's zoo was soon built and the Flight Aviary, now known as the Jack Lynch Aviary, was completed in 1962. In 1983, the amphitheater was completed and the zoo gained AZA accreditation.

The 1990s had three major events: in 1990, the Flight Aviary was upgraded and renamed the Jack Lynch Aviary; Amazon's Edge opened in 1992; and Colors of the Amazon Aviary opened in 1996. In the 2000s, the Zoofari Express Train Ride opened in 2000, Crean Family Farm opened in 2004, and Tierra de las Pampas opened in 2010. With its outdated monkey habitats, the Association of Zoos and Aquariums declined to accredit the zoo in 2017. It regained accreditation in 2025.

== Exhibits ==
=== Tierra De Las Pampas ===
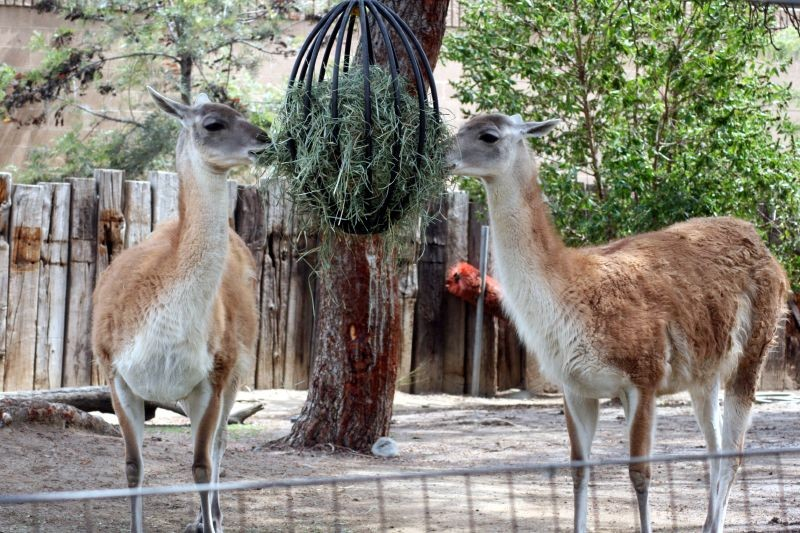
Guanacos feeding.

In April 2010, Santa Ana Zoo opened Tierra de las Pampas or "Land of the Grasses." It was the first in a series of new exhibits that covers 2 acres (8,100 m^{2}). Tierra de las Pampas houses giant anteaters in one exhibit, and greater rheas and guanacos in another, with a visitor footpath located in between them.

=== River's Edge ===
On December 20, 2025, the exhibit opened to the public as an expansion and reimagining of the former "Amazon's Edge" exhibit (1993-2022). At the time of its opening, River's Edge features habitats for howler monkeys, spider monkeys, tamarins, and (temporarily) Asian small-clawed otters.

=== Rainforest Exhibit ===
The Rainforest Exhibit is a small exhibit that represents the Amazon, such as white-faced saki monkeys and green iguanas.

=== Colors of the Amazon Aviary ===
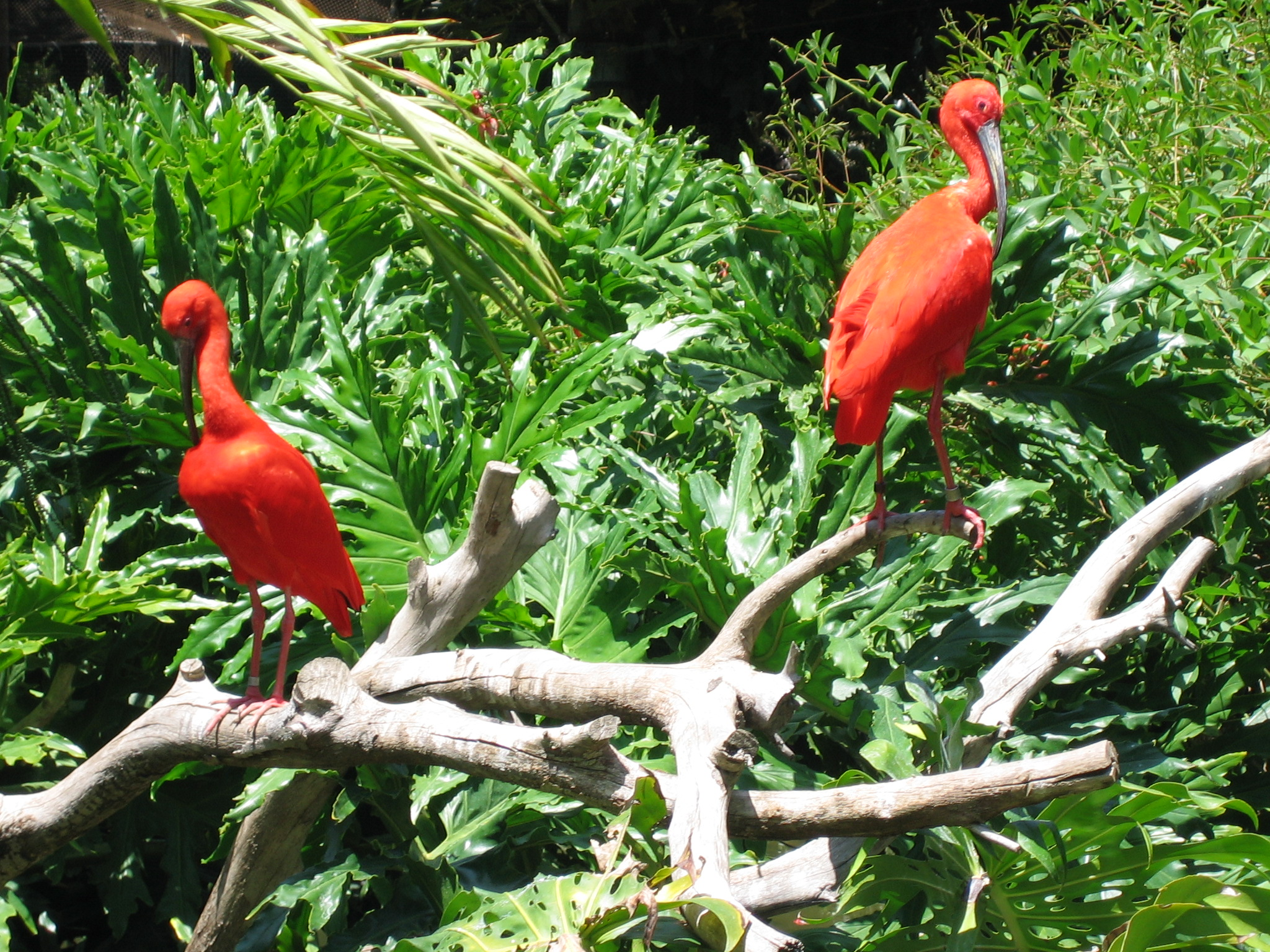
Scarlet ibis in Colors of the Amazon Aviary.

The 9,000-square-foot (840 m^{2}) Colors of the Amazon Aviary opened on August 1, 1996. This walk-through aviary displays a variety of South American birds in a lushly planted habitat with meandering streams.

=== Crean Family Farm ===
Crean Family Farm opened to the public in July 2004 and focuses on rare breeds of domesticated animals. The centerpiece of the complex is a two-story red barn which houses animals like pigs and an education space.

=== Ocelot Habitat and Education Center ===
The zoo's ocelot complex is home to a breeding pair of Brazilian ocelots located in two linked habitats. Interactive picnic tables let guests discover the special adaptations unique to ocelots.

== Other attractions ==
=== Children's train ===
One of the most popular attractions at the Santa Ana Zoo is the Zoofari Express children's train. There are two engines: 1030 and 1036. Both are 14 gauge, 4-4-4 configuration locomotives.

The original 1030 engine was constructed in 1954 by the Hurlbut Amusement Company of Buena Park. Engine 1030 was originally installed at Santa's Village in Sky Forest, California. It operated there continuously for 44 years. When Santa's Village closed in 1998, the Friends of Santa Ana Zoo purchased the entire train and 660 feet (200 m) of original track. The train was then restored by volunteers from Mater Dei High School with the help of Bud Hurlbut. The restored train opened at the Santa Ana Zoo in the spring of 1999. The track length was expanded to 1,850 feet (560 m). Engine 1030 was gas-powered, but in 2006 it was converted to electric power.

Engine 1036 is a new electric-powered locomotive that was installed in 2005, along with new passenger cars.

=== Carousel ===
The zoo also features a Conservation Carousel with a 33 animal line-up including the giraffe, giant panda, African elephant, cheetah, hummingbird, gorilla, bald eagle, jaguar, zebra, Bengal tiger, otter, panther, seal, sea dragon and a custom-made anteater. The carousel also features a wheelchair-accessible Studded Leather Swan Chariot.

== Incidents ==
In July 2018, Aquinas Kasbar broke into the enclosure for lemurs and capuchin monkeys and stole Isaac, the oldest living ring-tailed lemur in captivity at the time, to keep as a pet. He left the animal, unharmed, outside a Newport Beach hotel the next day with notes identifying him & instructing he be returned to the zoo. In July 2019 Kasbar pleaded guilty in federal court to unlawfully taking an endangered species and U.S. District Judge Andrew Guilford sentenced him to three months in prison, run concurrently with a state sentence for a series of residential burglaries.

== See also ==
- Orange County Zoo, Orange, California
