= Stapp (surname) =

Stapp is a surname. Stapp originates from the Middle English word for step (step(pe)), and likely denoted an individual living near a ford with stepping stones.

== List of people with the surname ==
- Andy Stapp (1944–2014), American anti–Vietnam War activist
- Babe Stapp (1904–1980), American racecar driver
- Chris Stapp (born 1973), New Zealand actor
- Emilie Blackmore Stapp (1876–1962), American children's author and philanthropist
- Frank Howard Nelson Stapp (1908–1993), New Zealand railway worker and concert impresario
- Gregory Stapp, American opera singer
- Henry Stapp (born 1928), American philosopher and physicist
- Jaclyn Stapp (born 1980), American beauty queen, fashion model, and philanthropist; wife of Scott Stapp
- Jack Stapp (1912–1980), American country music manager
- John Franklin Stapp (1937-2014), American minor league baseball player
- John Stapp (1910–1999), American aeronautical medicine expert
  - Stapp's ironical paradox
- Marjorie Stapp (1921–2014), American actress
- Milton Stapp (1792–1869), American politician
- Philip Stapp (1908-2003), movie director, writer, editor
- René Stapp, French racing driver
- Scott Stapp (born 1973), American singer-songwriter
- Will Stapp, American politician from Alaska
- Stephen Stapp, American financial advisor in Florida
