= René Stapp =

French racing driver

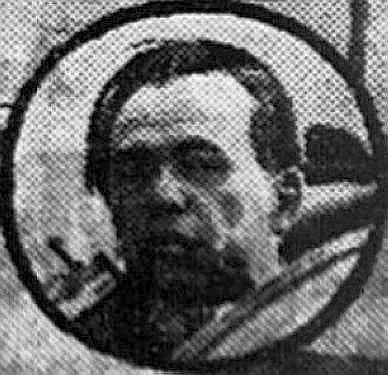
Stapp in 1932

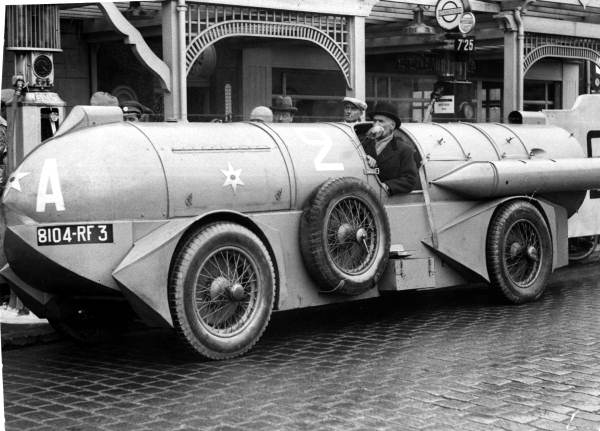
At Daytona Beach

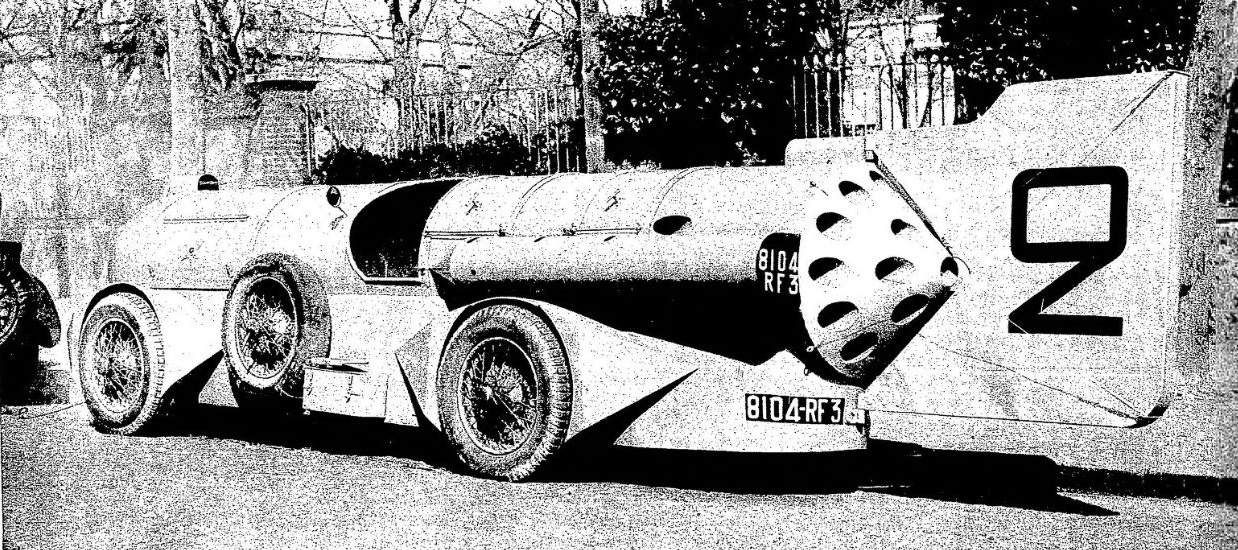
The "Jupiter" vehicle

René Stapp was a French racing driver. In 1932 he attempted to break the land speed record with one of the most outlandish, and ugliest, cars to attempt to do so.

The car was built in Paris between 1930 and 1932, then taken to Daytona Beach for an attempt at the land speed record.

Power was supplied by two Bristol Jupiter radial aero engines. Some web sources describe the car as Jupiter. Assuming a generous 600 bhp per engine in racing trim, this would have given a power comparable to Malcolm Campbell's cars and so it wasn't an obviously impossible contender. However the general engineering was at the Heath Robinson level and failed to inspire confidence.

The car was destroyed by fire on the beach at La Baule, a popular motor-racing venue of the period.
