= Niabi Zoo =

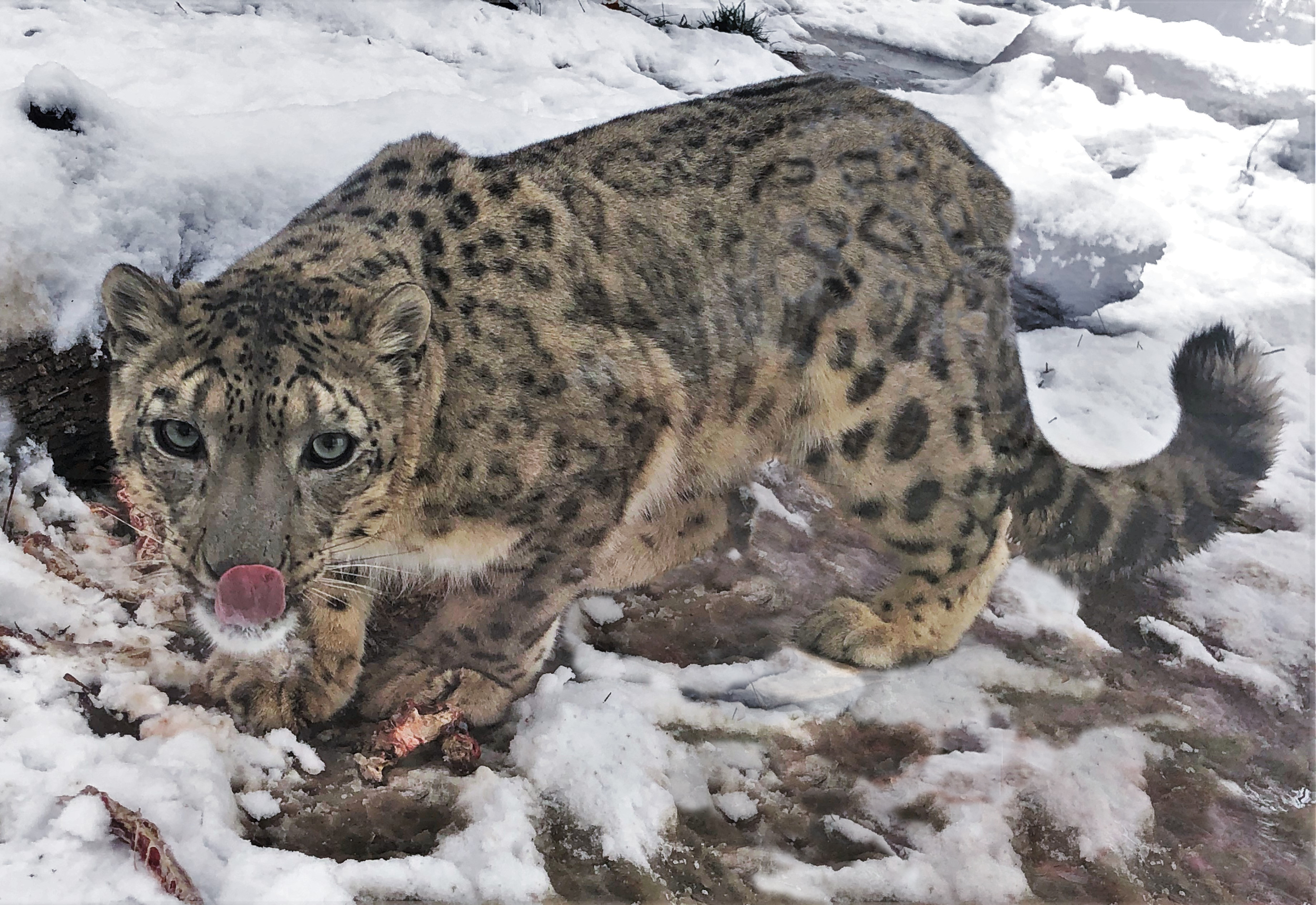
- Snow leopard at Niabi Zoo
- Interactive map of Niabi Zoo
- 41.4427°N 90.4339°W
- Location: Coal Valley, Illinois, United States
- Land area: 40 acres (16 ha)
- No. of animals: 600
- No. of species: 200
- Website: www.niabizoo.com

Niabi Zoo is a public zoological park in Coal Valley, Illinois, serving the Quad Cities Area. The zoo is 40 acres in size and is located inside of a 287 acre forest preserve. It contains more than 600 animals representing nearly 200 animal species from around the world. Niabi Zoo is open for general admission April–October annually and offers education and outreach programs year round.

Niabi is one of six facilities owned and operated by the Rock Island County Forest Preserve District.

== History ==
The zoo's name "Niabi" comes from the Native Americans language of the Wazhazhe (Osage Nation) and means "the fawn spared by the hunter." This meaning gives an insight into human nature and the power of choice. As the choice is made to spare the fawn to preserve it for the future, people are faced with the same choice when it comes to the conservation of species, habitats and global ecosystems.

Niabi Zoo was officially founded in 1963 but traces its history back to 1959, when local masonry contractor and animal lover, Gordon V. McLain, opened McLain's Wild Animal Farm to the public. It operated for just four years until Patti S. Wiman (1895–1976) purchased the Wild Animal Farm and some surrounding land in 1963 and deeded it to the Rock Island County Forest Preserve District, which continues to operate the Zoo today.

Timeline

1972: The zoo held its first Zoofari Ball fundraiser.

1974: Petting zoo opened.

1975: Zoo Train opened and was first known as the Mel McKay Express, a 1/3 replica of a Civil War era train.

1984: Education Center was constructed.

1985: Bird House (currently Biodiversity Hall) opened.

1986: Zoo officially established Volunteer program.

2002: Volunteer program expanded to incorporate teens in its Junior Zoo Keeper Program.

2003: Niabi opened the bald eagle exhibit.

2004: Animal care center for veterinary care was built.

2005: Gibbon habitat opened featuring modern zoo design, Australia walk-about constructed, and animal nutrition center was built.

2006: Niabi Zoo received accreditation by Association of Zoos and Aquariums (AZA).

2007: Passport to Africa exhibit opened featuring giraffes and colobus monkeys.

2008: Exhibit constructed for critically endangered red wolf.

2011: Zoo Discovery Center for education, administration, and admissions to new entry plaza and pond constructed.

2012: Niabi Zoo lost AZA accreditation.

2015: Coins for Conservation began donating to species conservation projects.

2017: Oceans exhibit opened in Discovery Center gallery, renovations to Biodiversity Hall and Reptile House. Became member of Quad Cities Earth Coalition.

2018: Conservation & Science Speaker Series launched and established conservation partnerships with Snow Leopard Trust and Painted Dog Research Trust. Helped form Bi-State Conservation Action Network (Bi-CAN) with regional partners.

2019: Niabi's conservation education department helped develop field education program for Painted Dog Research Trust in Zimbabwe, Africa and participated in Whale Shark tagging research with Ch’ooj Ajauil in Cancun, Mexico.

2020: Niabi Zoo received accreditation from the Zoological Association of America (ZAA).

2021: White Rhinoceros exhibit completed and Spineless Wonders invertebrate exhibit opened in Discovery Center.

== Habitats & feature animals ==
Discovery Center: First exhibit upon entry to the Zoo features rotational exhibits which have included Rainforest Trek, Oceans, and Spineless Wonders as well as a tamarin habitat.

Passport to Africa: Features giraffe habitat with a public feeding platform and giraffe house, primate exhibits with Black-and-white colobus monkeys, Wolf's Guenon and Allen's swamp monkeys. Giant aldabra tortoises can be seen as well.

White Rhino: Highlights the extinction threats facing the five species of rhinos as well as the adaptions of African rhinos. Features the Southern white rhinoceros.

Gibbons: With a large artificial tree and water feature, the Yellow-cheeked gibbons can be seen swinging from branch to branch.

Biodiversity Hall: This biologically diverse collection of species includes Linnaeus's two-toed sloth, fennec foxes, slender-tailed meerkats, African porcupine, Seba's short-tailed bats, white cockatoos, Axolotl, a 17-foot long reticulated python, and many more.

Cats: Has three species of leopards including Snow leopards, African leopards, and a highly endangered Amur leopard. Smaller cats such as Bobcats and Pallas's cats are also featured.

Reptile House: Includes many species of lizards, tortoises, snakes including the Green anaconda, and Poison dart frogs.

Wolf Ridge: Features critically endangered red wolves in a forested habitat located behind the Wolf's Paw concession cabin.

Domestic Animal Area: Petting Zoo for chickens, miniature zebu cattle, llama, alpacas, sheep, miniature donkeys, and San clemente goats.

Other animals: Bactrian camel, Ostrich, New Guinea singing dog, and others.

== Amenities ==
Conservation: Guests can contribute to multiple projects for species conservation at the Coins for Conservation kiosk, Rhino donation boxes, on-line donations and attending the Conservation & Science Speaker Series.

Education: Niabi Zoo educates to inspire people to take conservation action. Programs include Zoo Camp, classes, field trips, tours, animal encounters, Zoo2U outreach, guest speakers, university instruction, and media appearances.

Animal Feeding Experiences: Giraffe, Koi pond, domestic animals, Guinea pigs

Rides: Niabi Zoo Express Train, Endangered Species Carousel

Events: Animal event days (giraffe, snow leopard, endangered species, etc.), Boo at the Zoo Halloween, Pints for Preservation, Dine with the Animals and many more!

Other: Playground, picnic areas, pavilions, education center, gift shop, concessions, facility rentals, etc.

== Master plan ==
In 2018, the zoo released its master plan for the next six years. Since then, the White Rhino exhibit was completed in 2021. African Painted Dogs and Prairie Dogs was completed in 2023–24.

== Financial support ==
Niabi Zoo is funded through the Rock Island County Forest Preserve District, Zoo admission, program fees, memberships, grants, a small percentage of tax support, as well as donations and fundraising efforts from the Niabi Zoo and Forest Preserves Foundation.
