= Lupa Zoo =

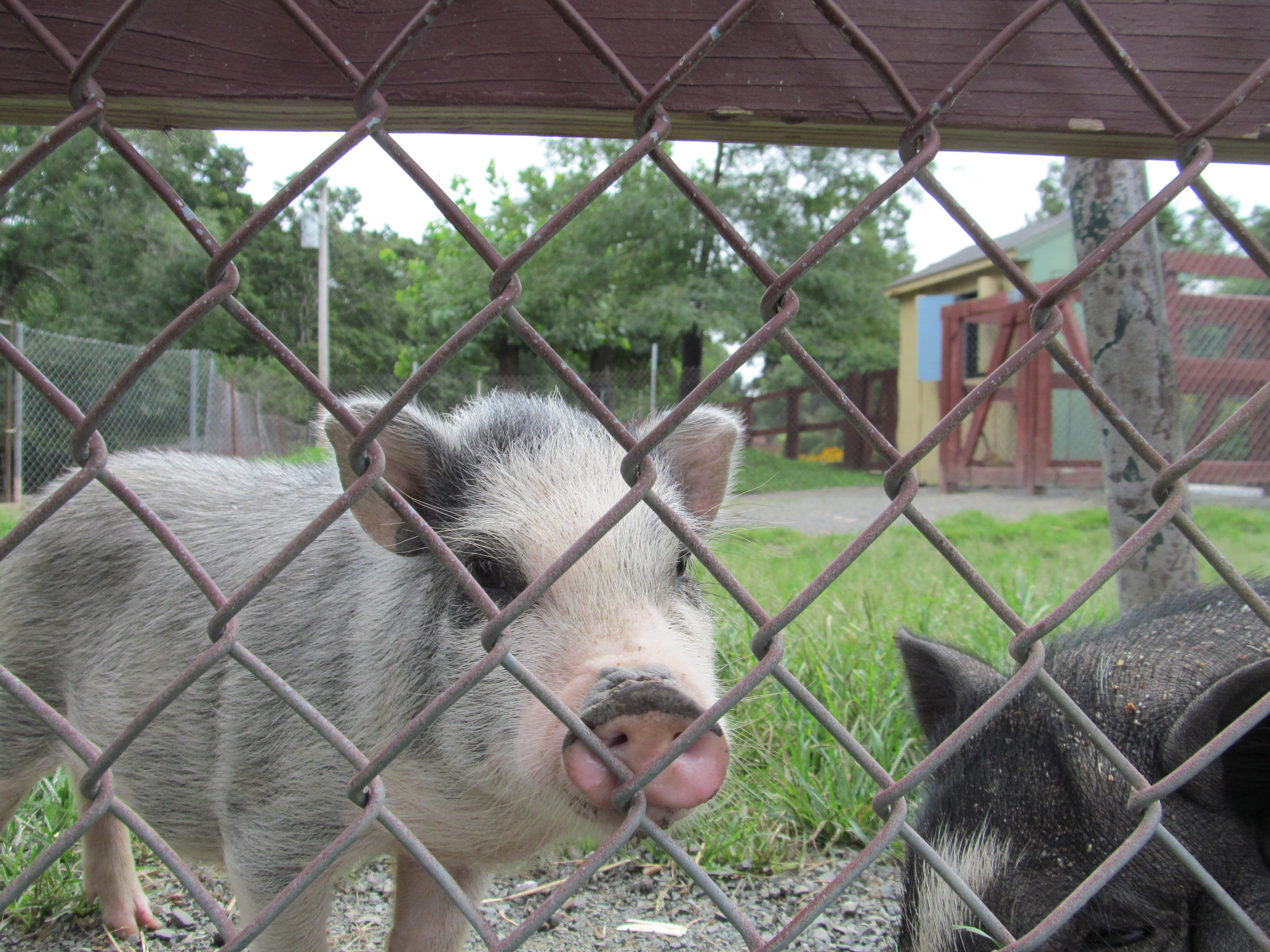
- Lupa Zoo
- Interactive map of Lupa Zoo
- 42°11′44.34″N 72°29′21.31″W
- Date opened: 1996
- Location: Ludlow, Massachusetts, United States
- Land area: 18 acres (7.3 ha)
- No. of animals: 500
- Website: www.lupazoo.org

Lupa Zoo is an 18-acre (7.3 ha) privately owned and operated zoo located in Ludlow, Massachusetts, United States.

== History ==
The zoo was created by Henry and Joan Lupa, who emigrated from Poland in the 1960s. They purchased a farm in Ludlow, and housed a small collection of animals. Originally, Henry Lupa started a landscaping company and then a construction company, but eventually decided to open a zoo, as local families would often come visit the animals on their farm. The Lupa Zoo officially opened in 1996, and gained a license from the USDA in 2002. Joan Lupa became the sole owner of the zoo after the death of her husband in 2013.

In 2018, there was an incident in which a capybara escaped from its enclosure after heavy rains damaged it. It was recaptured by USDA Wildlife Services and returned to the zoo.

== Exhibits ==
Exhibits include Indian blue peafowl, fennec fox, coati, pot-bellied pig, Aldabra giant tortoise, goat, pygmy goat, oryx, muntjac, collared peccary, wallaby, prairie dog, binturong, serval, bobcat, otter, bat, alpaca, zedonk, elk, American bison, donkey, tapir, Bactrian camel, nilgai, zebra, Himalayan black bear, common ostrich, emu, cow, porcupine, deer, macaw, and fox.

== Controversy ==
The zoo has received criticism for its repeated USDA violations.

An endangered African antelope escaped the Lupa Zoo in Massachusetts in April 2023 when a storm damaged her enclosure. She was caught five weeks later.
