= Wildlife West Nature Park =

- A wolf at the park
- Interactive map of Wildlife West Nature Park
- 35.0739°N 106.2036°W
- Location: Edgewood, New Mexico, United States
- Land area: 122 acres (49 ha)
- Website: www.wildlifewest.org

Wildlife West Nature Park is a 122-acre (49 ha) nature park, enhanced zoo, and entertainment venue located in Edgewood, New Mexico, United States. The Park is operated by the New Mexico Wildlife Association. Wildlife West is home to non-releasable animals of numerous species in native habitats, and also provides natural habitat for free roaming and migrant species. Wildlife West provides a variety of educational programs for people of all ages, and is perhaps the only zoo in the world that can claim to have been constructed entirely by youth participants.

== Animal enrichment ==
Wildlife West is dedicated to animal enrichment, seeking to provide environments, stimulation, and activities that encourage natural behaviors and contribute to the mental and emotional well-being of its inhabitants. The "native" look of the enclosures and habitats is the result of an intensive design process that takes into account the unique characteristics and psychology of the animals for whom they are created. Animals are provided with unique challenges associated with play and feeding, often in coordination with the Park's educational programs, that allow them to exercise the talents and abilities that have made them so well adapted to their natural environments.

== Education ==
Wildlife West provides several series of educational programs for participants of all ages. From wild bird handling classes to Junior Zookeeper day camps, the Park seeks to stimulate interest and enthusiasm for the wildlife and ecology of the American southwest.

== Events and entertainment ==
Wildlife West's facilities include an all-weather outdoor amphitheater and enclosed "bean barn." The Park produces several series of concerts and weekend music events, that are often coordinated with regional events such as the New Mexico Wind Festival; Edgewood Run, Rally, and Rock; and the Fall Harvest Festival. Nationally recognized performers such as John McCutcheon, Karl Shiflet and Big Country Show, the Byron Berline Band, Valerie Smith and Liberty Pike, Shawn Camp, and the Lynne Morris Band have appeared at many of Wildlife West's music festivals along with New Mexico favorites like Elliot's Ramblers, Raising Cane, Hot Club of Santa Fe, and Syd Masters and the Swing Riders. During such events, the Park often offers dry camping opportunities for participants. During the summer season, Wildlife West also hosts weekly Chuckwagon Suppers including live "old west" music.

== Gallery ==
Festus, a turkey vulture, spreads his wings.

Carrie, a coyote, takes a moment to ponder the meaning of life.

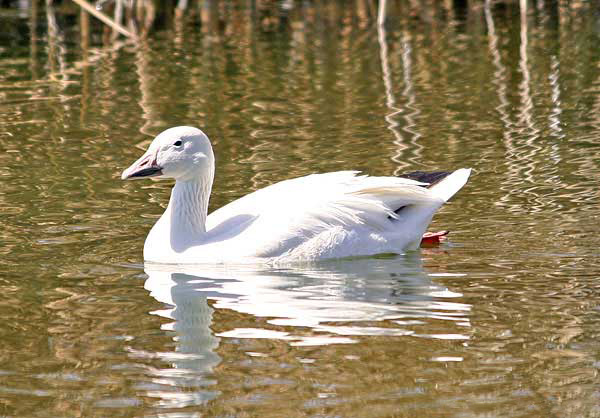
The Park's pond is home to a variety of resident wildlife and migratory waterfowl.
