= Big Bear Alpine Zoo =

Zoo in Big Bear Lake, California, United States

- Interactive map of Big Bear Alpine Zoo
- 34°14′18.3″N 116°52′3.3″W
- Date opened: 1959
- Location: Big Bear Lake, California, United States
- No. of animals: 160
- No. of species: 80
- Website: bigbearzoo.org

The Big Bear Alpine Zoo, formerly Moonridge Animal Park, is a zoo in Big Bear Lake, California, United States. The zoo is one of two Alpine zoos in the United States. It specializes in the rehabilitation and release of local Alpine species and also has a permanent collection of animals in the zoo (most of which can not be released). The zoo is located across the street from Bear Mountain Ski Resort.

== History ==
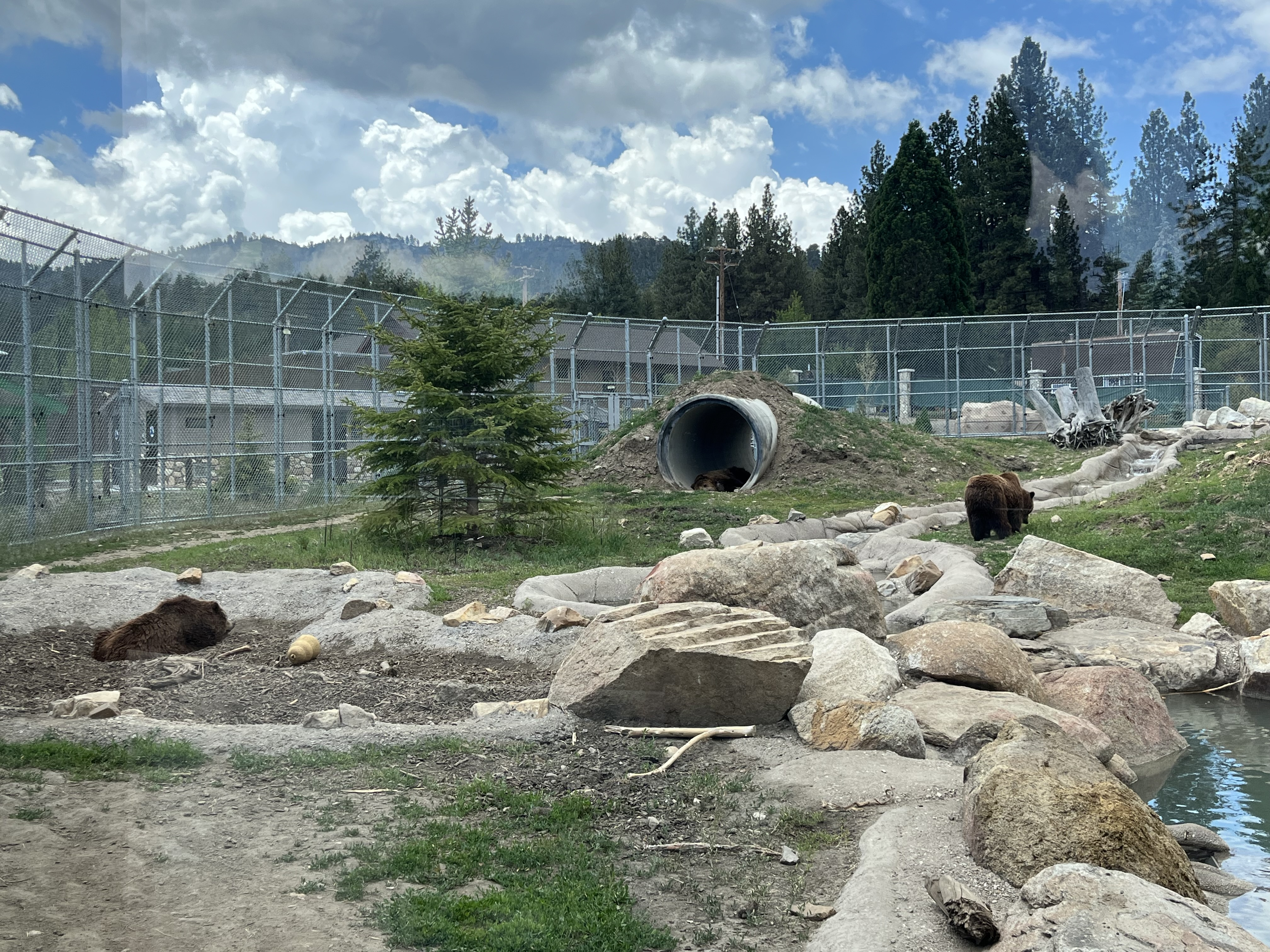
Grizzly enclosure at the zoo.

The Big Bear Alpine Zoo has been saving alpine wildlife since 1959. Originally it was not a zoo, but a safe place for injured animals to rehabilitate and get a second chance back in the wild. The facility is owned and operated by Big Bear Valley Recreation and Park District, a Special District of the County of San Bernardino.

The Big Bear Alpine Zoo is a rehabilitation facility offering injured, orphaned and imprinted wild animals a safe haven; temporarily while they heal or permanently as they are unable to survive on their own. 90% of all animals brought to the zoo for rehabilitation are successfully released back onto their native environment. Those that remain on exhibit are either too injured or have been imprinted by humans and cannot be released back into the wild to care for themselves.

The "Friends of the Big Bear Alpine Zoo" was formed in 1989 as a non-profit 501(c)(3) public-benefit corporation whose purpose is to support the Big Bear Alpine Zoo through: (1) Educating the public regarding treatment, protection, and conservation of wildlife; (2) Recruiting and coordinating park volunteers; and (3) Fundraising.

The zoo began construction of a new location in 2016, and opened to the public November 5, 2020. The address is 747 Clubview Drive., Big Bear Lake.

== Animals ==
The Big Bear Alpine Zoo provides wildlife rehabilitation and release. Those animals that cannot be released are given a home for life in the zoo. The Big Bear Alpine Zoo is the only zoological facility located in an alpine forest specializing in alpine species. zoo residents include grizzly bears, black bears, cougars, wolves, and eagles, to name a few of the 160 animals representing 80 species.
