= Tregembo Animal Park =

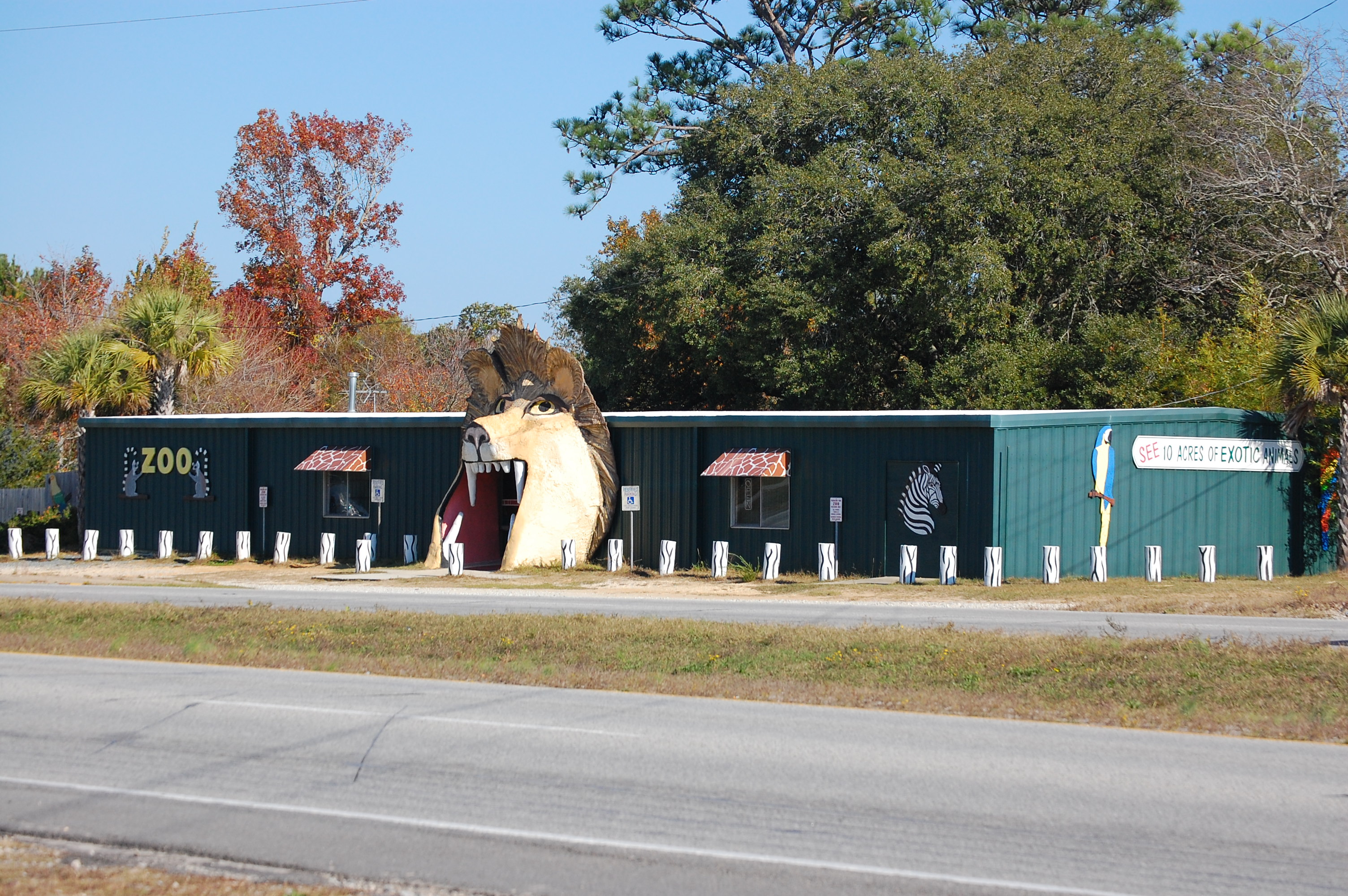
- Interactive map of Tregembo Animal Park
- 34.1262°N 77.8976°W
- Date opened: 1958
- Location: 5811 Carolina Beach Rd, Wilmington, North Carolina
- Land area: 10 acres (4.0 ha)
- Website: www.tregemboanimalpark.com

Tregembo Animal Park is a zoo in Wilmington, North Carolina. Founded as the Tote-Em-In Zoo in 1952 by George and June Tregembo, featuring animals and a collection of "oddities", the park was renamed the Tregembo Animal Park in 2004. Following the retirement of the owner, the facility was leased to Jerry Brewer until 2003 when the Tregembo family took over operations. Following this change, the Tregembos wanted to change the focus to education.

== Animal care ==
In 1998, PETA cited the Tote-Em-In zoo as one of the worst of road side zoos in the country. After the transition in 2004, the Tregembo family sought to enlarge the park and increase the size of enclosures. The animal park, however, still relies on concrete pads and cages to hold many of the animals, a practice criticized by many as inadequate treatment costly to the animals.

While receiving general positive inspections from the USDA, the facility is not accredited by the American Zoo and Aquarium Association. In 2015 following a complaint by PETA, the USDA cited the zoo for inadequate veterinary care. The manager claimed the USDA cleared the park after a follow-up inspection.
