= Menominee Park Zoo =

- Interactive map of Menominee Park Zoo
- 44°01′17″N 88°31′06″W
- Date opened: 1945
- Location: Oshkosh, Wisconsin, United States
- Land area: 8 acres (3.2 ha)
- Public transit: GO Transit
- Website: Official website

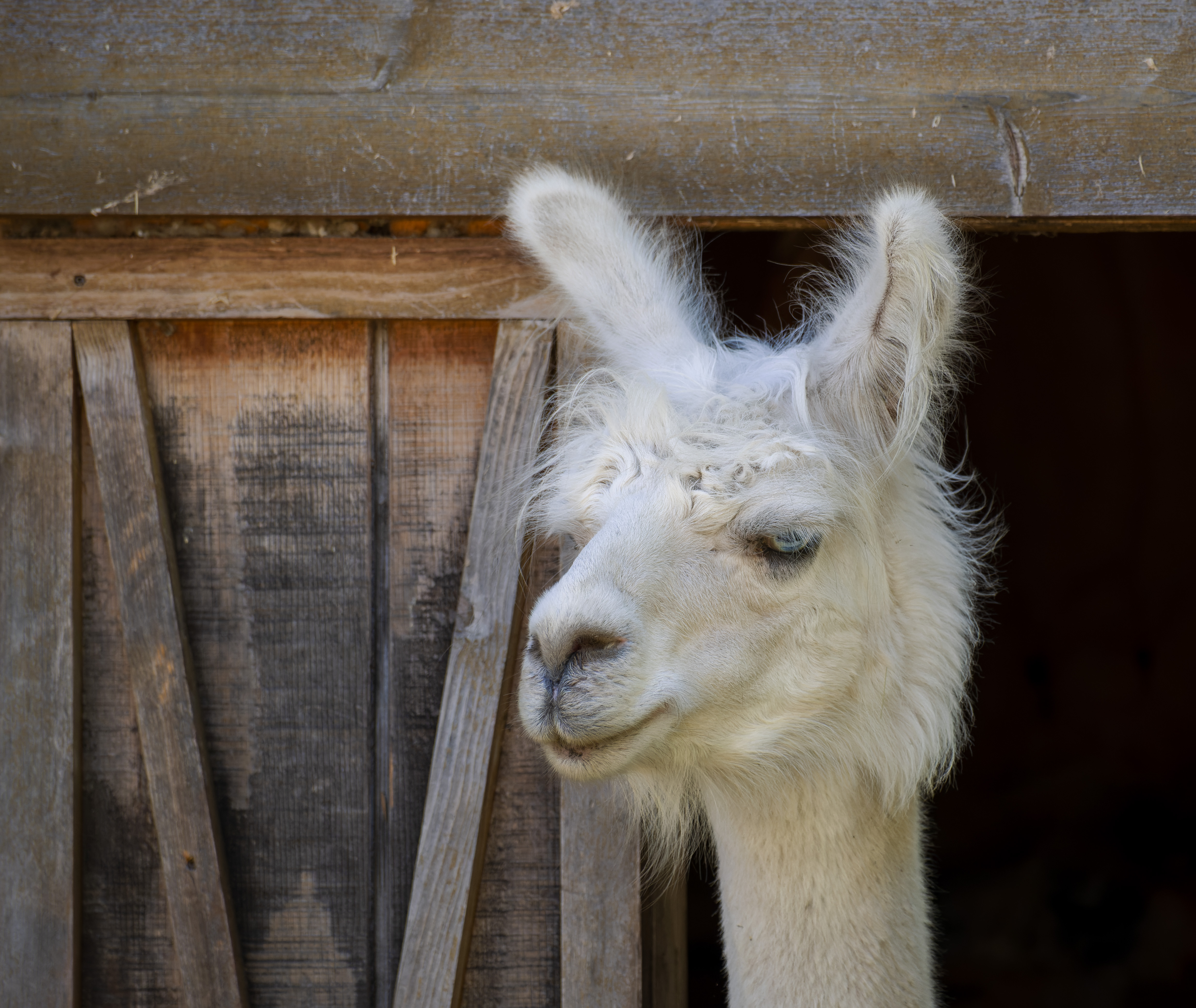
Lama (Lama glama) at the Menominee Park Zoo

Bald Eagle (Haliaeetus leucocephalus) at the Menominee Park Zoo

American Elks (Cervus Canadensis)

Gray Wolf (Canis Lupus)

Sicilian Donkey (Equus Asinus)

The Menominee Park Zoo is a free, small 8-acre (3.2 ha) zoo located in Oshkosh, Wisconsin, within Menominee Park, operated by the Oshkosh Zoological Society.

Menominee Park is the city's largest park located on the near north side of Oshkosh on Lake Winnebago. The zoo is surrounding the lagoon at the center of the park.

The zoo was founded in 1945. A couple donated funds to begin free access in 2006.

The zoo typically houses between 30 and 50 animals, including many different kinds of otters, elk, wolves, tortoises, birds, and some other seasonal animals. Peacocks roam freely around the zoo.
