= Cat Tales =

Cat Tales Wildlife Center
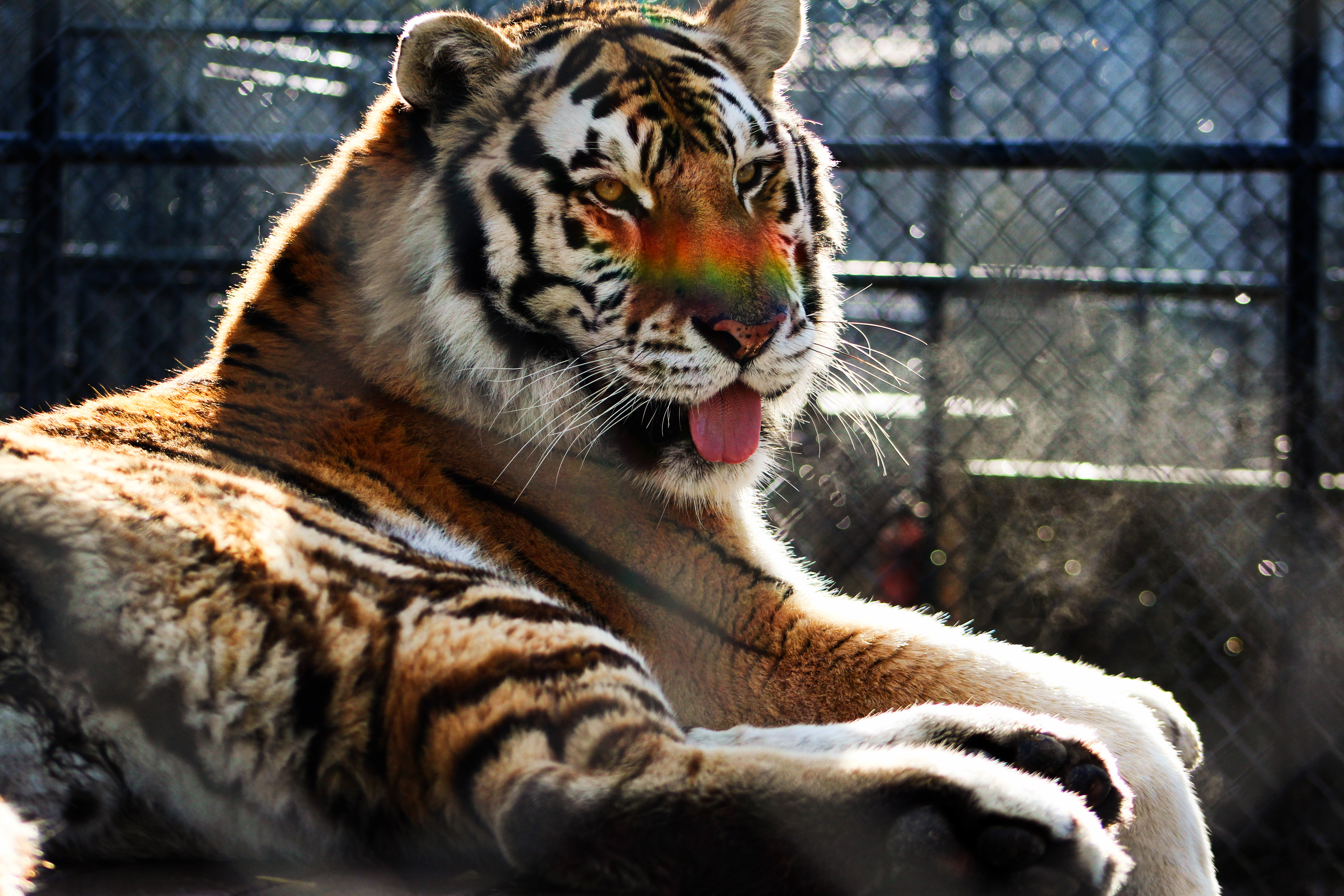
- Tuga the Siberian Tiger
- Interactive map of Cat Tales Wildlife Center
- 47°48′28.6″N 117°20′54.9″W
- Date opened: 1991
- Location: Mead, Washington, United States
- Website: www.cattales.org

Cat Tales Wildlife Center, formerly Cat Tales Zoological Park and known simply as Cat Tales, is a private zoo located in Mead, Washington.

== History ==
Cat Tales Zoological Park was started by married couple Mike and Debbie Wyche in backyard of their Colbert, Washington, home when they decided to convert it as a zoo for their four big cats. Mike Wyche, then an insurance salesman, and his wife, who had trained in large cat care, spent $10,000 to install cages and additional buildings in their yard. The zoo officially opened in the summer of 1991, and visitors were invited into the house after signing waivers. It opened weekend public tours in November of that year and became a popular field trip destination for Mead School District students and some patrons of the then-declining Walk in the Wild zoo. However the fact that they were located near a residential area became a point of contention in the local community and a proposal was drafted to regulate exotic animal ownership.

In the early 1990s, Mike Wyche was charged by the federal government with conspiracy "to keep a cougar in defiance of a state Department of Fish and Wildlife order" and making false statements in documents about the source of their cats; he pled guilty in 1994.

In early 2004, Cat Tales was sued by a South Korean actress over a 2003 incident. The lawsuit claimed that the actress had been bitten and scratched by one of the zoo's tigers, Zeus, and that the zoo had been negligent. The zoo responded by saying that the actress had signed a waiver, provoked the tiger, and was exaggerating the extent of her injuries; the lawsuit was withdrawn without prejudice in November of that year and the actress ordered to pay the zoo's attorney fees.

In 2018, the Wyches announced they might retire; the following year, Mike Wyche died on August 22 and Debbie Wyche said she would ""like to see [the zoo] go another thirty years".

== Organization ==
Cat Tales is a privately-owned zoo, funded by donations, admissions fees, and students at their zookeeper-training program.

They had received donations from tennis player Jan-Michael Gambill.

=== Animals ===
At the time of the zoo's opening, they had four cats. By 2008, they had between 40 and 50 large cats, as well as black bears, a python, a parrot, and house cats.

Cat Tales acquires animals through private surrenders.
