= Collins Zoo =

- Interactive map of Collins Zoo
- 31.6159659°N 89.5379305°W
- Date opened: 1988
- Location: Collins, Mississippi, USA
- No. of animals: 300
- No. of species: 100
- Website: www.collinsmszoo.com

The Collins Zoo, formerly the Collins Exotic Animal Orphanage, is a zoo located in Collins, Mississippi. The zoo has been closed since May 2013.

== History ==
The Collins Zoo was founded in 1986 by Gus and Betty White. The zoo had been raided several times by the Mississippi Department of Wildlife, Fisheries and Parks. The last raid in 2012 was ruled to have violated the Whites' due process rights.

The zoo's USDA license was revoked in May 2013. The zoo has been closed since that time.

== Legal issues with the State of Mississippi ==
In 2001, state wildlife officials raided the zoo and seized several skunks, alligators, alligator snapping turtles, bobcats, and several other species of animals indigenous to Mississippi.

In March 2010, the zoo was again raided by the Mississippi Department of Wildlife and an opossum, red-eared slider turtles, and some box turtles were taken. The zoo was issued 22 citations, many for "lack of permits for inherently violent animals."

The final raid on January 25, 2012, included three tigers, three cougars, two leopards, two wolf hybrids, and one rhesus macaque monkey. The animals were relocated to sanctuaries in Texas and North Carolina.
