= Bear Country USA =

Wildlife park in South Dakota

- Bear Country USA logo

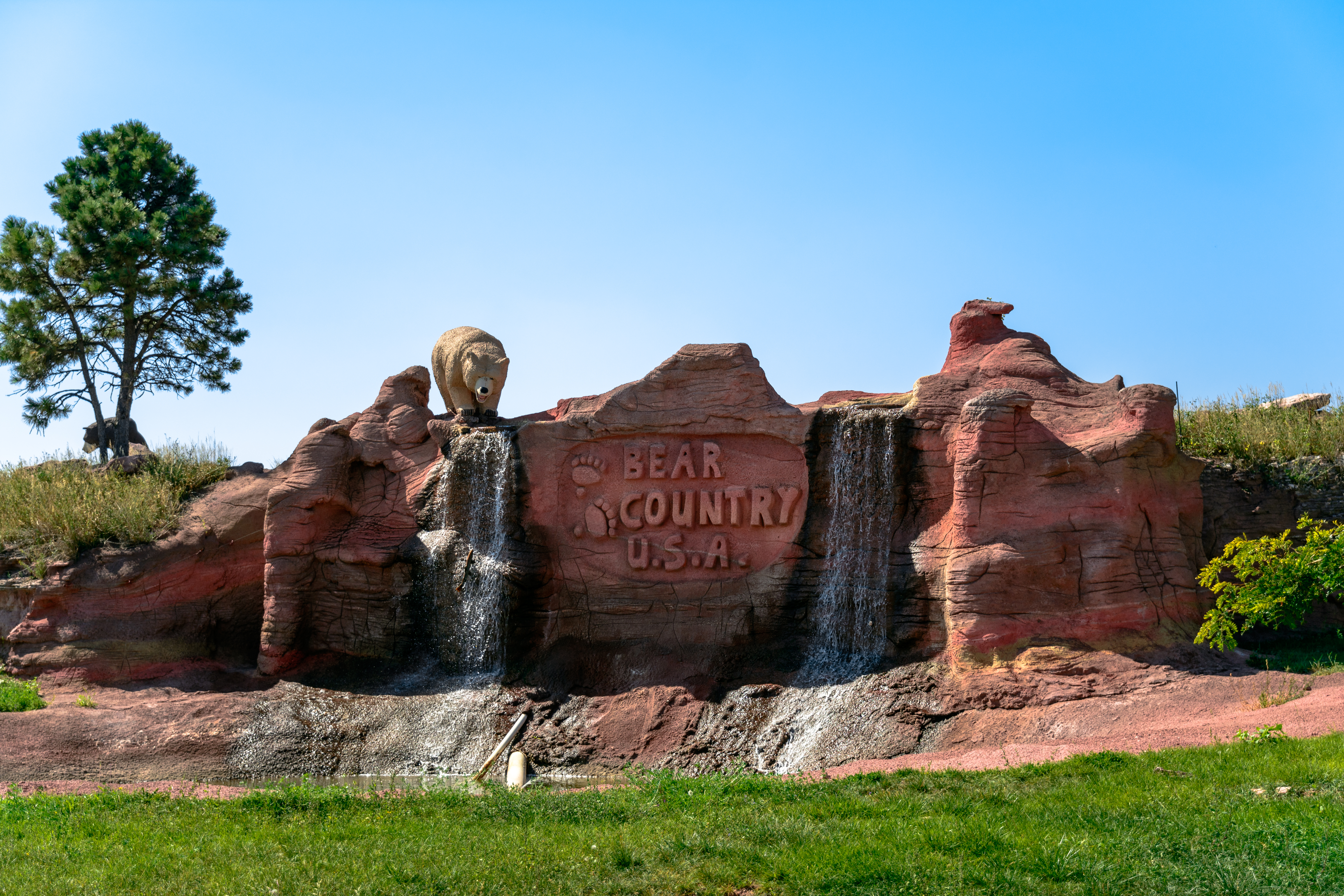
- Sign inside the park, 2017
- Interactive map of Bear Country USA
- 43°58′37.6″N 103°17′57.2″W
- Date opened: July 1972
- Location: 13820 U.S. Route 16, Rapid City, South Dakota, U.S.
- Land area: 250 acres (100 ha)
- No. of species: 26
- Website: bearcountryusa.com

Bear Country USA is a drive-through wildlife park and zoo in the Black Hills near Rapid City, South Dakota. Founded in 1972, the park is noted for its bears, but also hosts other North American wildlife, such as wolves, elk, mountain lions, and buffalo. The park stretches over 250 acres (100 ha), with drive-through enclosures and a walking area called Babyland, where young and small animals are exhibited.

== History ==
Dennis and Pauline Casey started the park as a means of income and to capitalize on 200 acres (81 ha) of land they already owned adjacent to U.S. Route 16, a tourist corridor between Mount Rushmore and Rapid City. Dennis, a dentist by trade, got the idea after visiting Lion Country USA in California. On a family trip to Yellowstone National Park, Dennis asked visitors why they were visiting, and more than a third replied they wanted to see bears.

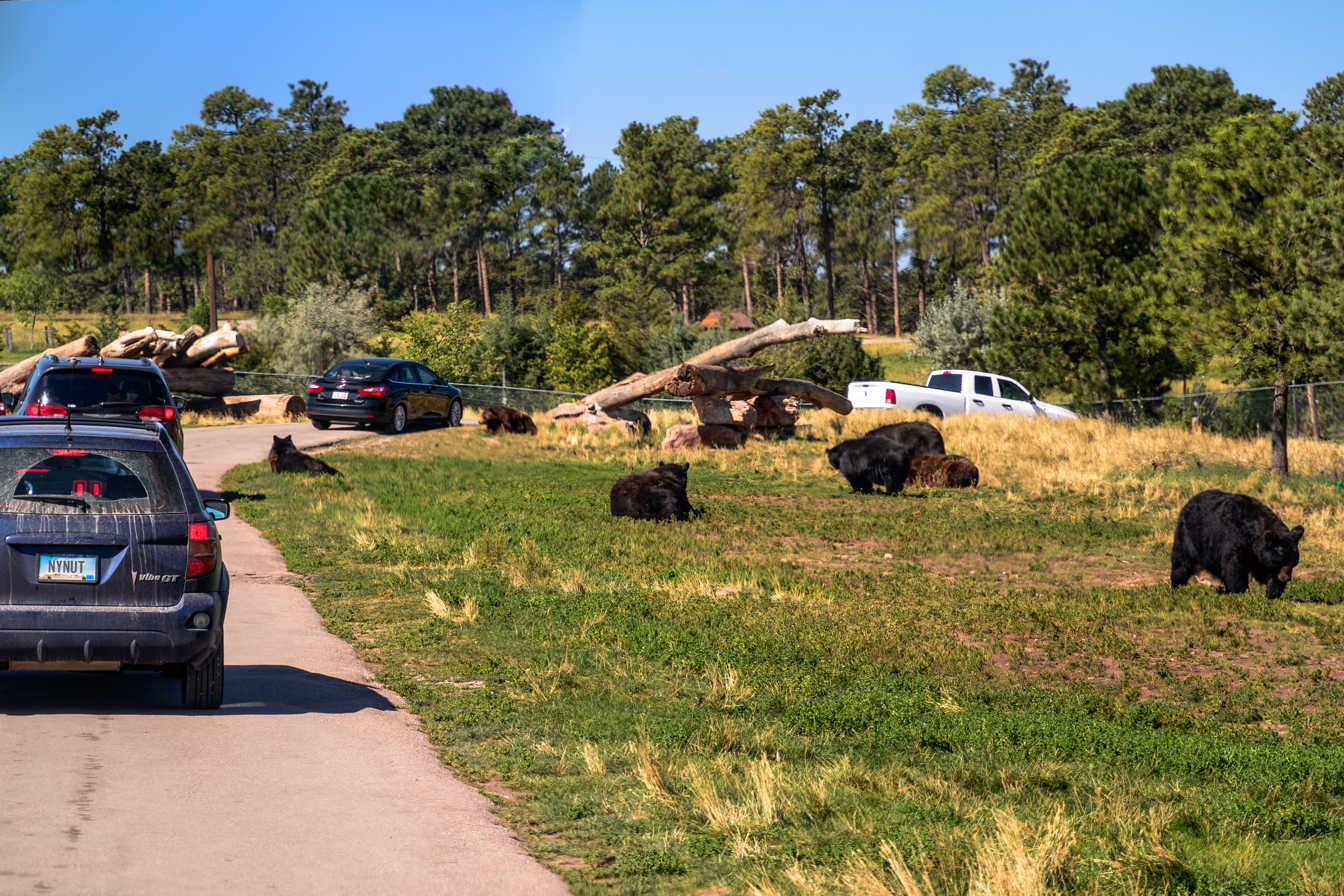
Bears inside the driving route

The park opened in 1972 and originally had 11 black bears, one wolf, one mountain lion, one elk, and three buffalo. By June 1973, the park had 25 bears, 7 buffalo, 15 wolves, 8 mountain lions, 3 elk, a fox, a coyote, and deer. Different species were hosted in exhibits separated by electric cattle fences. The park also stationed employees in guard towers to keep watch over the animals and visitors.

Dennis and Pauline had seven children together, all of whom helped run the park. After Dennis Casey died in 2000, his son Kevin took over as president until 2008. In May 2006, the Rapid City Convention and Visitors Bureau awarded the Casey family the Extra Mile Award for their contributions to Black Hills tourism through Bear Country USA.

In 2010, an internal dispute broke out within the Casey family. Pauline, her daughter Shannon, and two of her sons, John and Mike, gained control of the board of directors for the park. In response, the eldest four sons—Brendan, Dennis, Kevin, and Sean—moved to dissolve the company, as they lacked confidence in the other group's ability to run the park. During a court hearing in April 2010, a judge valued Bear Country USA at more than $18 million. Pauline's group bought out the eldest sons' remaining shares in the company, officially taking ownership of the park. Two of the eldest sons, Dennis and Sean, left Bear Country USA and introduced plans to start their own drive-through wildlife park, Bearizona, in Arizona. Pauline Casey died in 2022.

== Description ==
Bear Country USA's wildlife park features a 3-mile-long (4.8 km) driving route. Visitors drive through various enclosures and can view several North American animal species from their vehicles. Visitors are required to keep the doors and windows of their vehicles closed.

Nearby is Babyland, also called the Wildlife Walk, a zoo that houses the park's bear cubs and other young or small animals. During the spring, bear cubs are moved from their dens to Babyland. Some of the cubs are later sold to other zoos, while others are kept at Bear Country USA.

The park hosts an annual "Cubfest", where visitors can meet and handle the park's bear cubs. During the event, the cubs are switched out to rest; the event has been cancelled during years where there are not enough cubs to rotate.

=== Animals ===
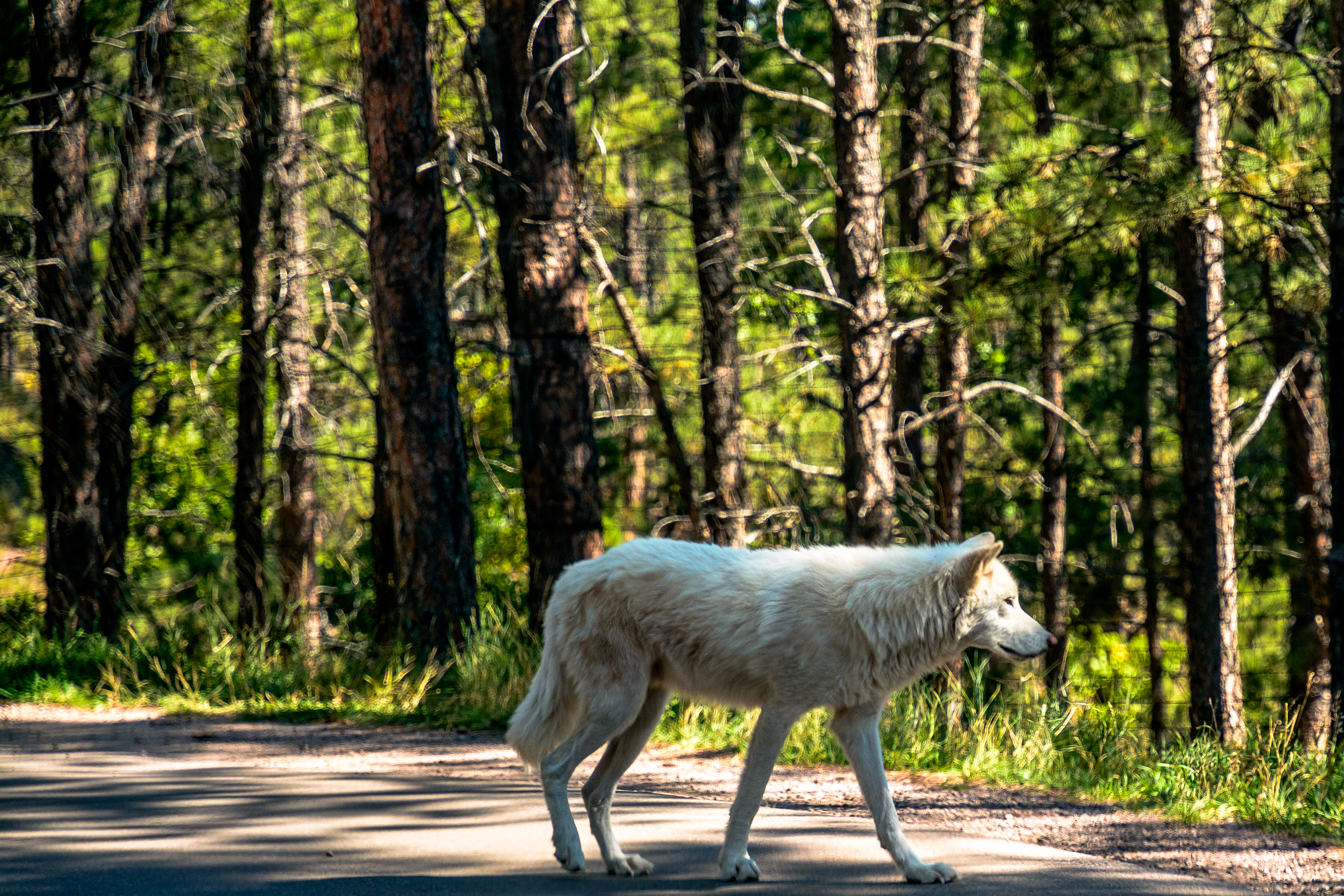
Wolf crossing a road inside the park

Bear Country USA currently has the following animals in their exhibits:

- American badger
- American bison
- American black bear
- American marten
- Arctic fox
- Arctic wolf
- Bighorn sheep
- Bobcat
- Canada lynx
- Collared peccary
- Cougar
- Coyote
- Eastern wolf
- Elk
- Fisher
- Groundhog
- Mule deer
- North American porcupine
- North American river otter
- Prairie dog
- Pronghorn
- Raccoon
- Red fox
- Reindeer
- Striped skunk

Some of the park's animals have been cast in acting roles. One of the park's bears, Casey, became an animal actor in several films, including Baloo in a 1994 rendition of The Jungle Book, Because of Winn-Dixie, and Evan Almighty. Some of the first wolves in the park were in various film roles, and one of the first mountain lions was featured in commercials for Dodge.

== Controversies and incidents ==
=== Animal escapes and incidents ===
On June 10, 1973, a mountain lion inside the driving route leapt through the open window of a mobile home and attacked a 1-year-old boy inside. The lion was killed by the child's grandmother and the boy was treated at a Rapid City hospital. The family later sued the park for damages and settled out of court in January 1975.

During the early years of the park, one buffalo and one mountain lion separately escaped from the park. The buffalo joined a herd in Custer State Park and the mountain lion was shot. In April 1984, three bears escaped after a snowstorm damaged a fence in their enclosure. Two bear cubs escaped again in April and May 1985. In October 2017, two more cubs escaped and were later found in a nearby backyard; they were subsequently returned to the park.

=== Sale of bear parts ===
In 2006, two members of the Casey family, Kevin and Brendan, were charged with illegally selling bear parts, prohibited under the Lacey Act of 1900. According to court documents, the two brothers slaughtered bears, then harvested and sold about $26,699 worth of parts, which included meat, paws, and gallbladders, between 1999 and 2001. (Note: Under South Dakota state law, the slaughter of bears is legal with a permit and under supervision of the South Dakota State Animal Industry Board; Bear Country USA did possess the required permit and the slaughter was overseen by the state board.) Both Casey brothers accepted a plea deal; on June 20, 2006, they pled guilty to two federal misdemeanor counts for the sale of the gallbladders and paid restitution to the United States Fish and Wildlife Service, in exchange for incurring no further charges. On October 3, 2006, US District Court Judge Richard Battey ordered the Casey brothers to each pay a $4,000 fine and serve one year of probation, and ordered Bear Country USA to pay a $20,000 fine.

Prosecutor Bob Prieksat stated the brothers intentionally bred bears for later slaughter, comparing the operation to a "puppy factory". Bear Country USA denied the allegation and said in a press release:

Bear Country USA's goal is to provide an avenue for our visitors to enjoy the majesty of these and other incredible animals in a humane and safe setting. Indeed, Bear Country USA is participating heavily with organizations that are on the cutting edge of bear biology, reproductive physiology and other research disciplines geared to protecting the species of bears that are on the endangered species list. We have an excellent rapport with the USDA and South Dakota State Animal Industry Board, and have been conscientious in following their guidelines and suggestions.

Prieksat also stated bears were also found on a private Casey family ranch near Wind Cave National Park, which Bear Country USA initially denied and stated there had never been bears at the ranch; the following day, the Casey family amended the statement and said bears were sometimes kept there.

Battey opposed the filing of charges, stating it was "a type of crime that has no moral turpitude to it". South Dakota Attorney General Mark Vargo concurred that the violations were done in ignorance of the Lacey Act and did not know it was illegal; both Vargo and the defense attorney, Richard Vermiere, agreed that it had still been the Caseys' responsibility to check the legality of their actions. Both Kevin and Brendan Casey apologized to the court and admitted they were remorseful and had made a mistake.

At the same time, Bear Country USA was charged with, and subsequently pled guilty to, purchasing two grizzly bears for $4,000 in March 2003 and transporting them from Minnesota. Because grizzly bears are considered an endangered species in the contiguous United States, the interstate sale is prohibited under the Lacey Act. Bear Country USA accepted a plea agreement in which they were allowed to keep the two bears but could not sell them or their offspring within five generations.

=== Separation of bear cubs ===
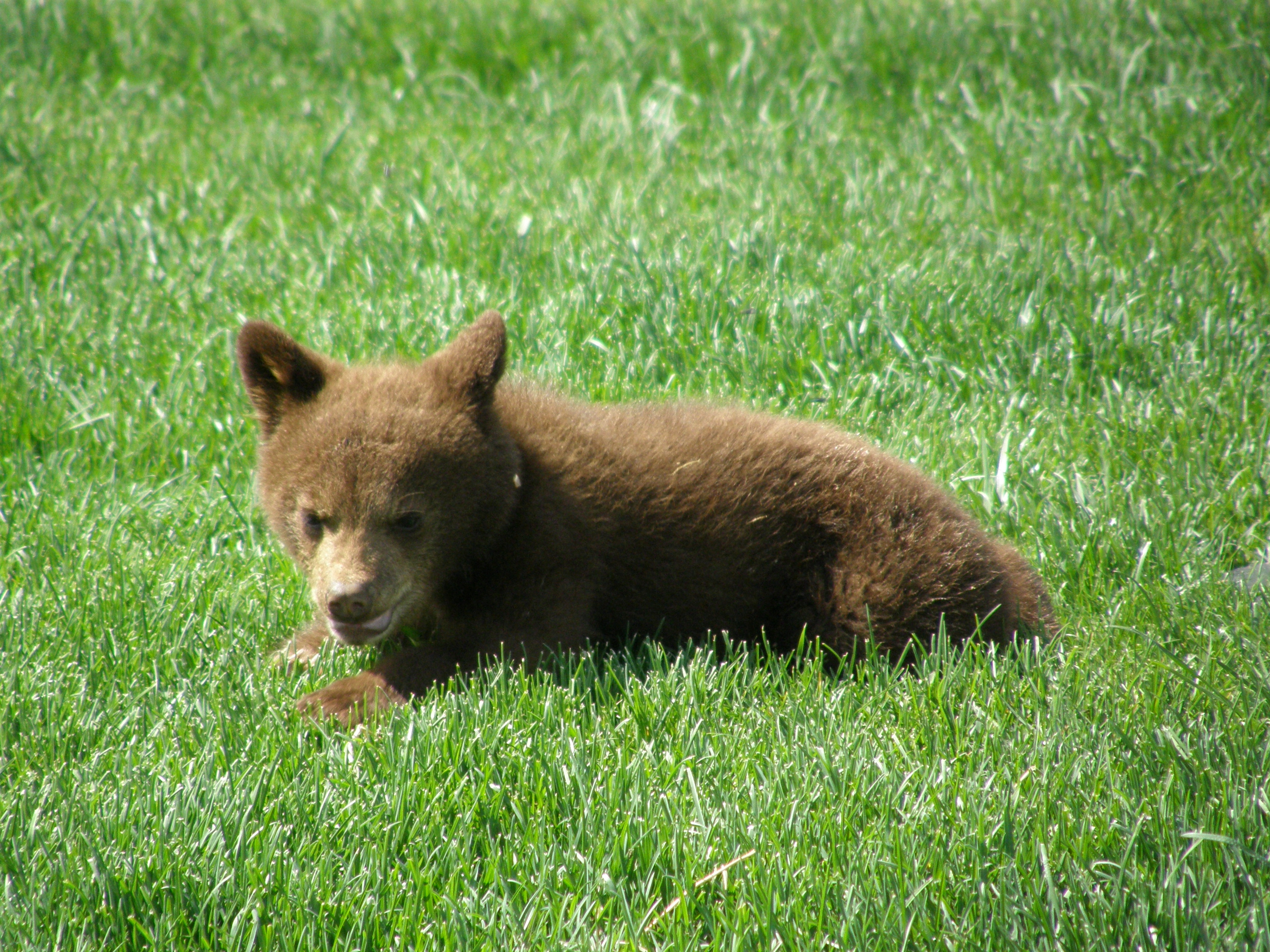
A black bear cub at Bear Country USA

Each year, Bear Country USA rounds up bear cubs from their dens to be hand-reared and eventually moved into Babyland. The park states this is done for the cubs' protection because male bears might attack and eat cubs, as well as to prevent disease. Various methods of removing the cubs have been employed. A 1987 article described the use of firearms, bottle rockets, chainsaws, and other loud devices to scare off the adult bears and allow extraction of the cubs.

In 2023, People for the Ethical Treatment of Animals (PETA) denounced the park and its usage of fireworks, as well as accusing its employees of abusing the animals.
