= Orange County Zoo =

Zoo in the city of Orange, California, United States

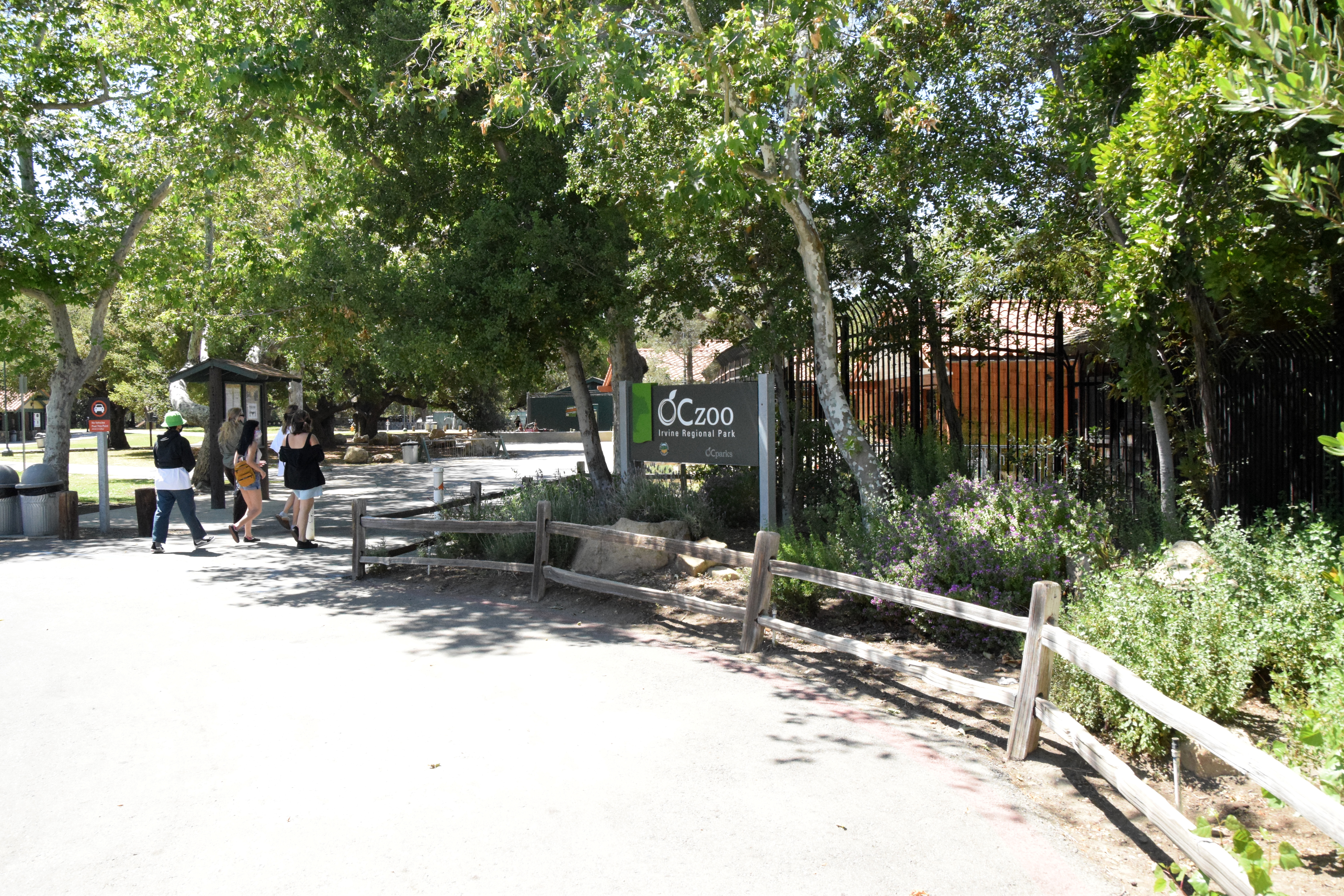
- Main entrance
- Interactive map of Orange County Zoo
- 33.79636°N 117.75068°W
- Date opened: 1985
- Location: Orange, California, United States
- Land area: 8 acres (3.2 ha)
- Website: www.ocparks.com/oc-zoo

The Orange County Zoo is a small 8-acre (3.2 ha) zoo located within the 477-acre (193 ha) Irvine Regional Park in the city of Orange, California, United States. The zoo is mainly home to animals and plants that are native to the Southwestern United States.

== History ==
The current zoo is owned, staffed and operated by the County of Orange, and officially opened as the Irvine Park Zoo in 1985.

However, there have been animals in captivity on the site since 1905, when red foxes were introduced and bred by J.A. Turner. In 1920, a small collection of animals featuring a pair of mule deer was started by Tustin rancher Sam Nau. Eventually Nau built a pen for the deer. The main attraction was an alligator exhibit until a bird exhibit including cockatoos, quail, doves, and parakeets was added in 1935.

== Animals ==
Animals at the zoo are primarily North American species, notably from the western and southwestern U.S. and northern Mexico, such as the American black bear, bald eagle, barn owl, bobcat, coatimundi, coyote, great horned owl, mountain lion, mule deer, North American porcupine, red-tailed hawk and turkey vulture. The zoo's resident animals typically arrive needing some type of emergency care due to being injured, orphaned, or abandoned by their mother. Others arrive as surrendered, illegally-owned exotic pets, or are rescued by the zoo as confiscated pets; whether injured, orphaned or surrendered, all of these animals have lost their wild instincts to survive and therefore must be cared for. In turn, these rescues become “animal ambassadors”, or representatives for the plight of their species, and help educate locals and visitors about the wildlife they may encounter in the hills, canyons, and backyards of the Southern California area.

The zoo includes a barnyard area with domestic animals, such as goats, Jacob sheep, doves, and pheasants. Visitors can purchase grain to feed the animals, and can pet and touch the hoofed animals.

== Other facilities ==
The zoo offers mobile phone audio tours. Visitors can hear information about the animals in the exhibit from the animal keepers, veterinarian, education coordinator, and curator, including their names, diet, where they came from, and why they are at the zoo.

== Gallery ==
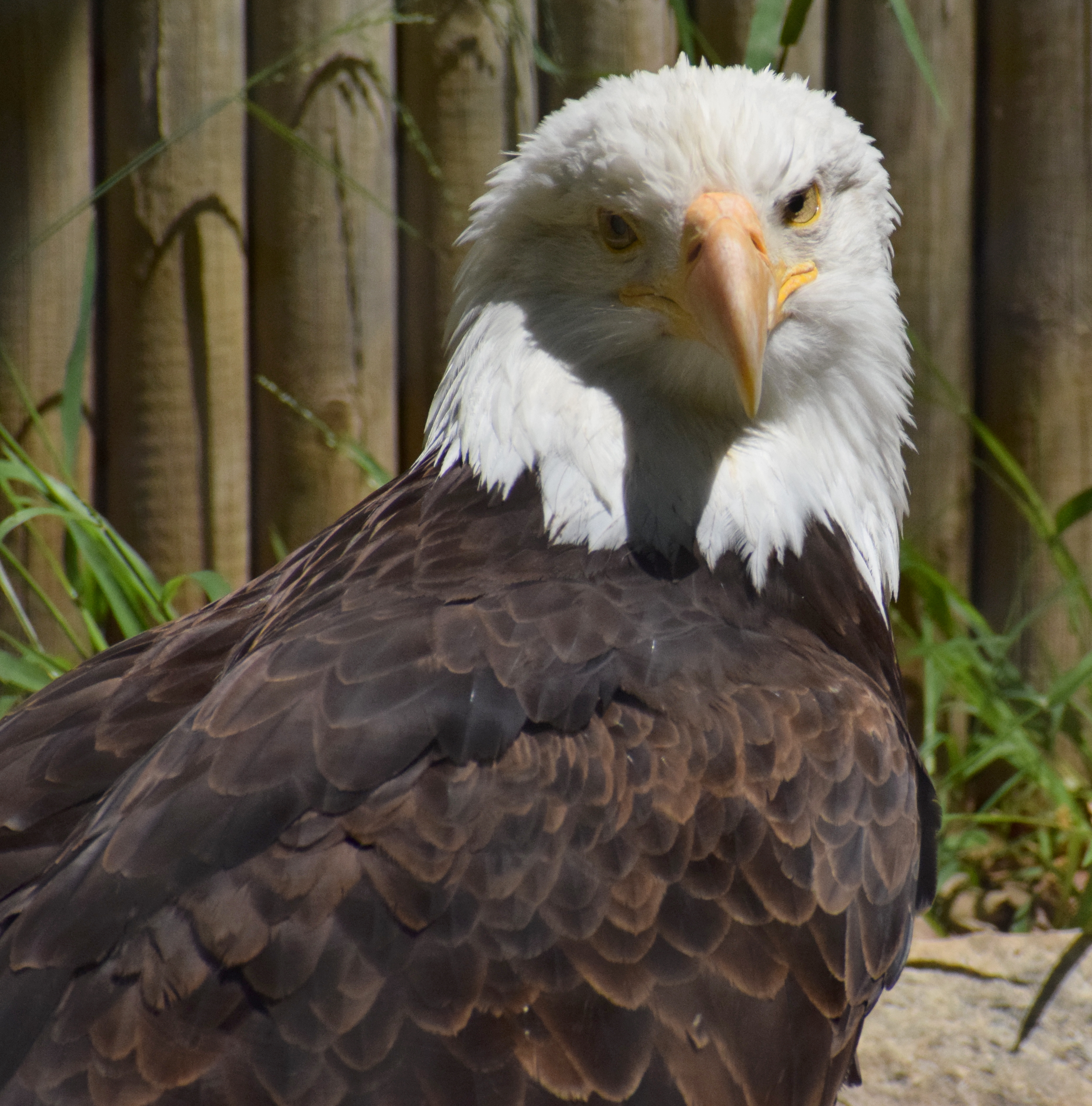
Bald eagle.

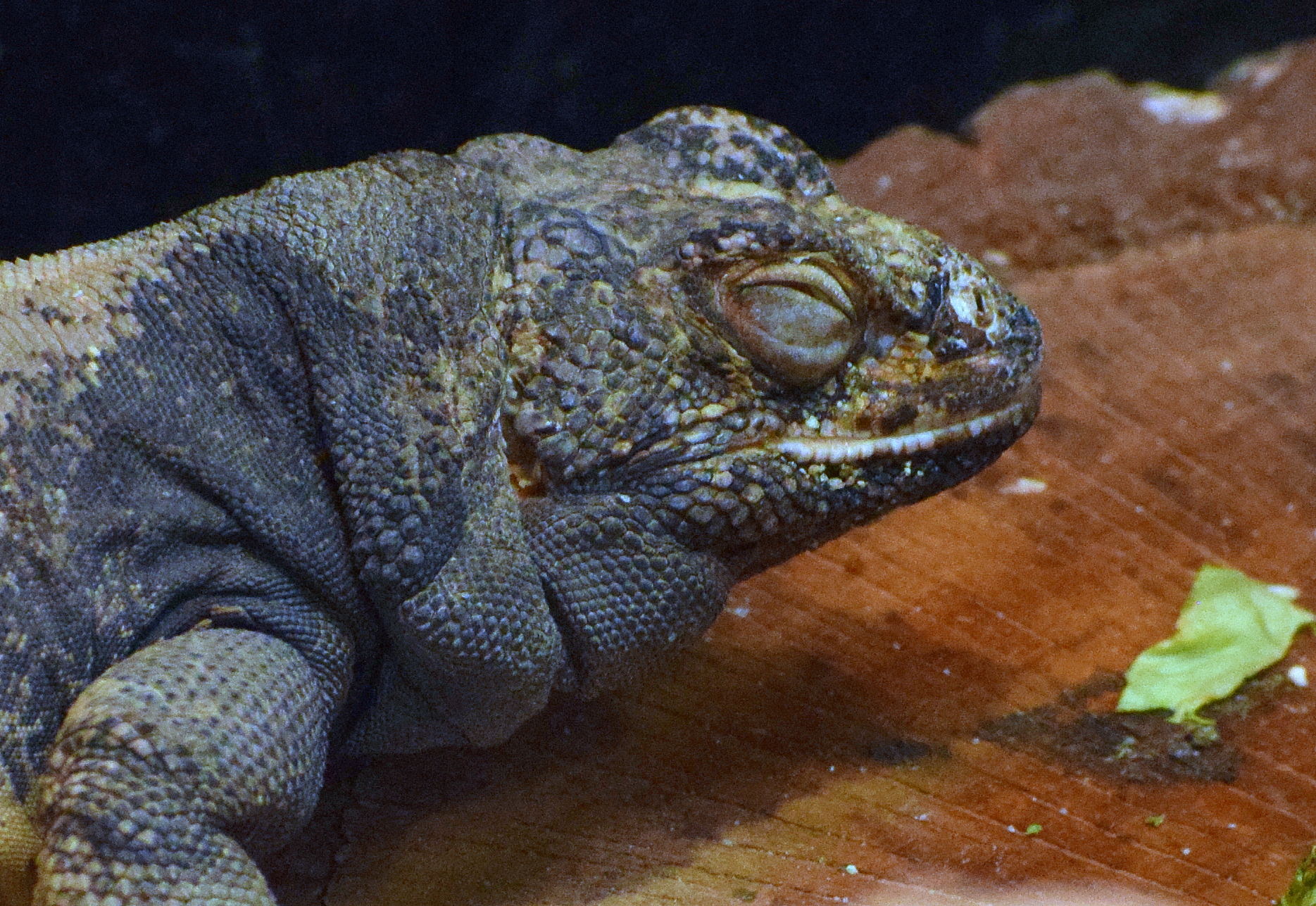
Various reptiles in the zoo.

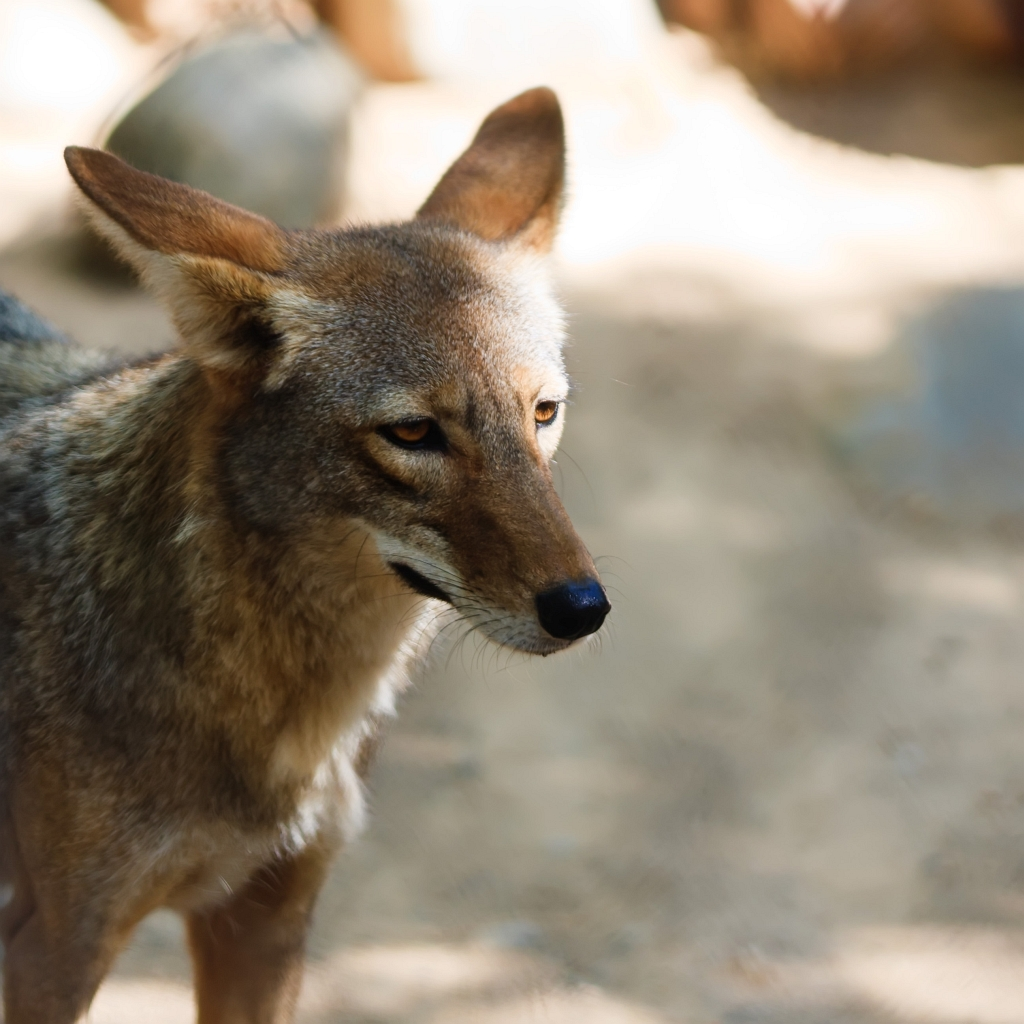
Coyote.

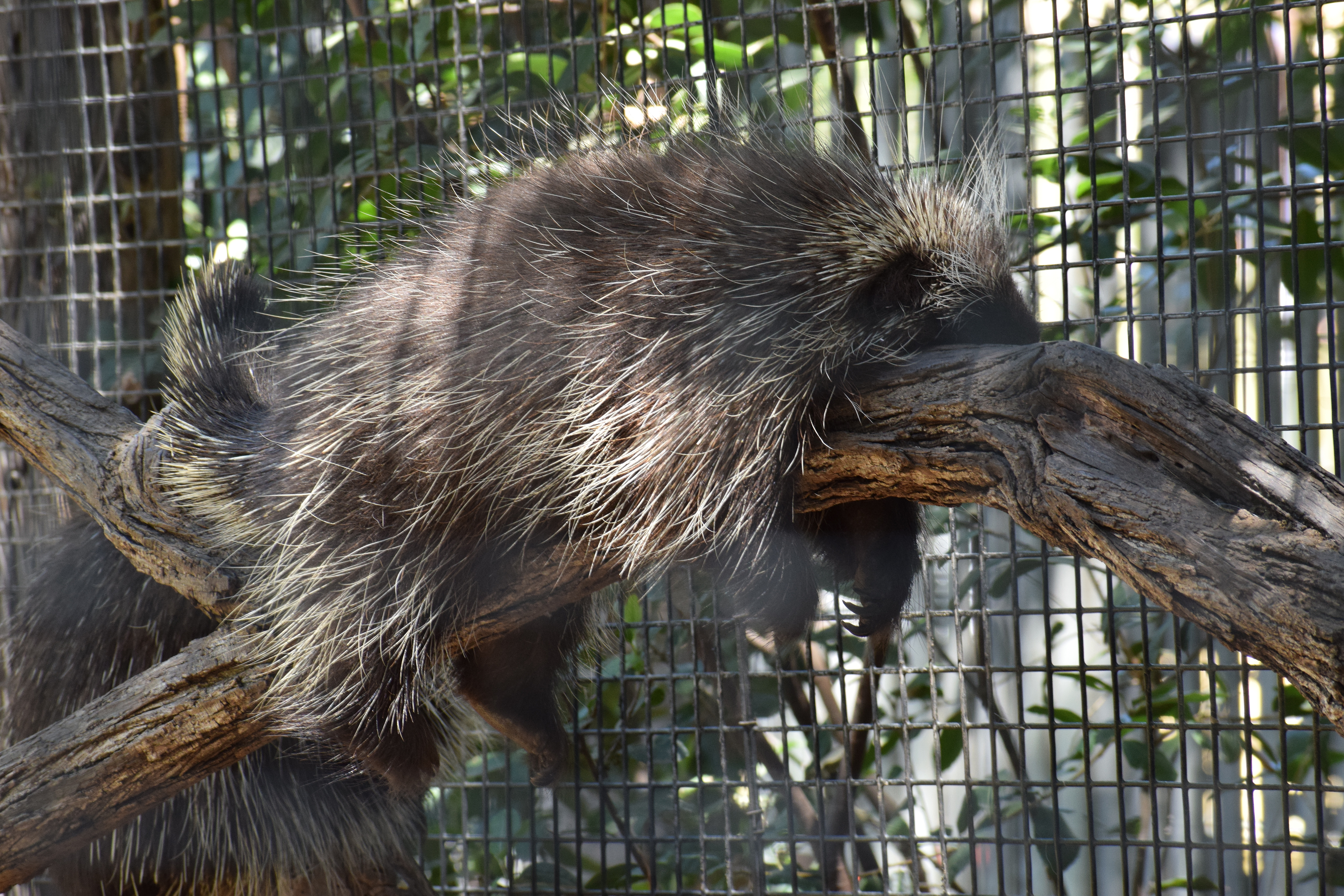
North American porcupine.

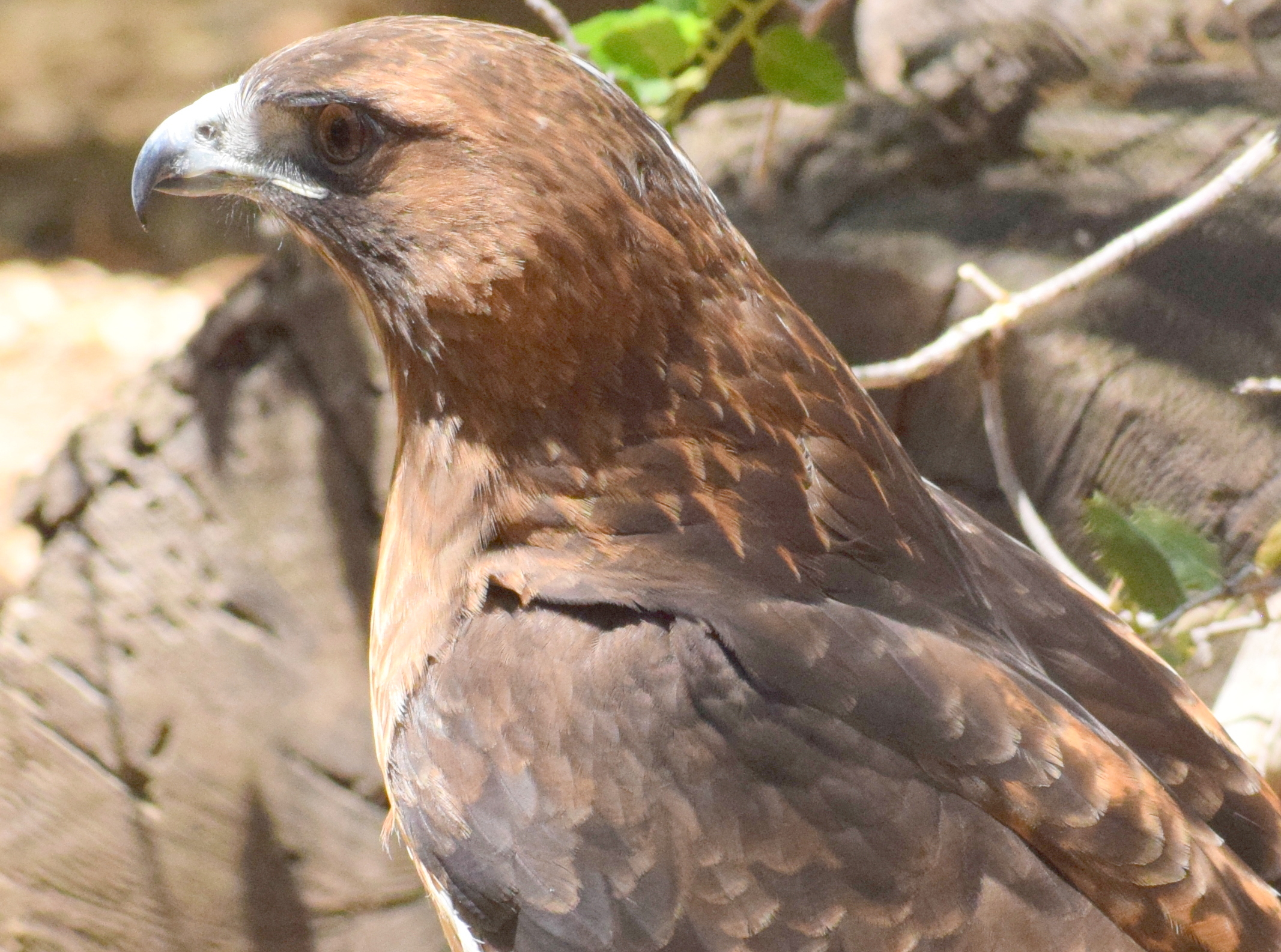
Red-tailed hawk.
