= Stapp's Circle S Ranch =

- Interactive map of Stapp's Circle S Ranch
- 39.3200556°N 85.3900684°W
- Date opened: 2001
- Date closed: 2015
- Location: Greensburg, Indiana, United States

Stapp's Circle S Ranch was a non-profit, educational petting zoo located in Greensburg, Indiana, United States.

The mission of the ranch is to educate people, especially children, about animals from around the globe. The ranch was started by Jim and Theresa Stapp about 2001, first as a family hobby, then developing into a local attraction.

Every year the facility has grown in number and breeds of animals, and the number of visitors. The ranch acquired two tiger cubs, a Siberian and an Indo-Chinese tiger cub, in late June, 2010. The ranch had also at one time collaborated with Jeff Watson and the Greensburg Grizzly Adventure, and hosted the famous grizzly, Brody the Bear.
