= HollyWild Animal Park =

Zoo in South Carolina, United States

Hollywild Animal Park
- Interactive map of Hollywild Animal Park
- 35.024408°N 82.1432292°W
- Location: Wellford, South Carolina
- Land area: 100 acres (40 ha)
- No. of animals: 500+
- Website: www.hollywild.com

Hollywild Animal Park is a non-profit zoo in Wellford, South Carolina. The 100-acre (40 ha) park has more than 500 animals. A number of the animals have appeared in TV shows and movies. The park includes an outback safari which covers more than 70 acres (28 ha). The animals roam freely in this area, giving guests the opportunity to hand feed animals such as fallow deer, sika deer, white tail deer, zebras, bison, Watusi cattle, Scottish Highlanders, donkeys, emus, and more.

The park was named for their animals' history with films and commercials. Some of their stars include Tank the southern white rhinoceros, Capuchin monkeys, zebras, chimpanzees, African lions, cougars, an Appaloosa horse, macaws, lynx, Siberian tigers, brown bears, leopards, baboons, jaguars, orangutans, camels, and Asian elephants. HollyWild also focuses on learning opportunities for the guests, beginning with hand feeding animals, but they go as far as field trips, programs for scouts, camps, home school Days, and outreach programs.

== Early days ==
HollyWild was started by the Meeks family. They started with typical farm animals and animals native to South Carolina in their back yard. In 1970, the M&M Zoo opened with Donna the Elephant (1967-2007) as one of the stars of the park. Because the animals are hand raised, they are often used in movies and the acting world.

== 2015 Fire ==
On January 9, 2015, a zoo worker arrived on site to find smoke in a barn where some of the animals live. A fire had started overnight due to an electrical short in a lighting installation. Twenty-eight animals had died due to smoke inhalation, including eight endangered lemurs, two capuchin monkeys, four chimpanzees, two baboons, two mangabeys (monkeys), one bear cub, one African crowned crane, three tortoises, four wolf hybrid puppies, and one cat. Fourteen other animals in the building survived.

As a result, the group PETA, which advocates for animal rights, called for park to be stripped of its license and shut down.

== Financial Problems ==
After the 2015 fire and reports of Federal regulation violations, turnout to the park decreased in 2016. A GoFundMe page was created to raise $500,000 to keep the park open. It was then reduced to $250,000. As of January 2017, the fund received $865. The park closed for the Winter (as it normally does) and hosted a holiday lights festival. In January 2017, the park cut a majority of the staff to continue to stay open. On March 30, 2017, Hollywild Chairman Tim Todd announced that the park would not open for the 2017 season and that it was likely that the park would not reopen to the public. However, the park has since reopened in a limited capacity where visitors can drive through the park from the safety of their vehicle and interact with animals that approach them.
