= African Lion Safari =

Safari park in Ontario, Canada

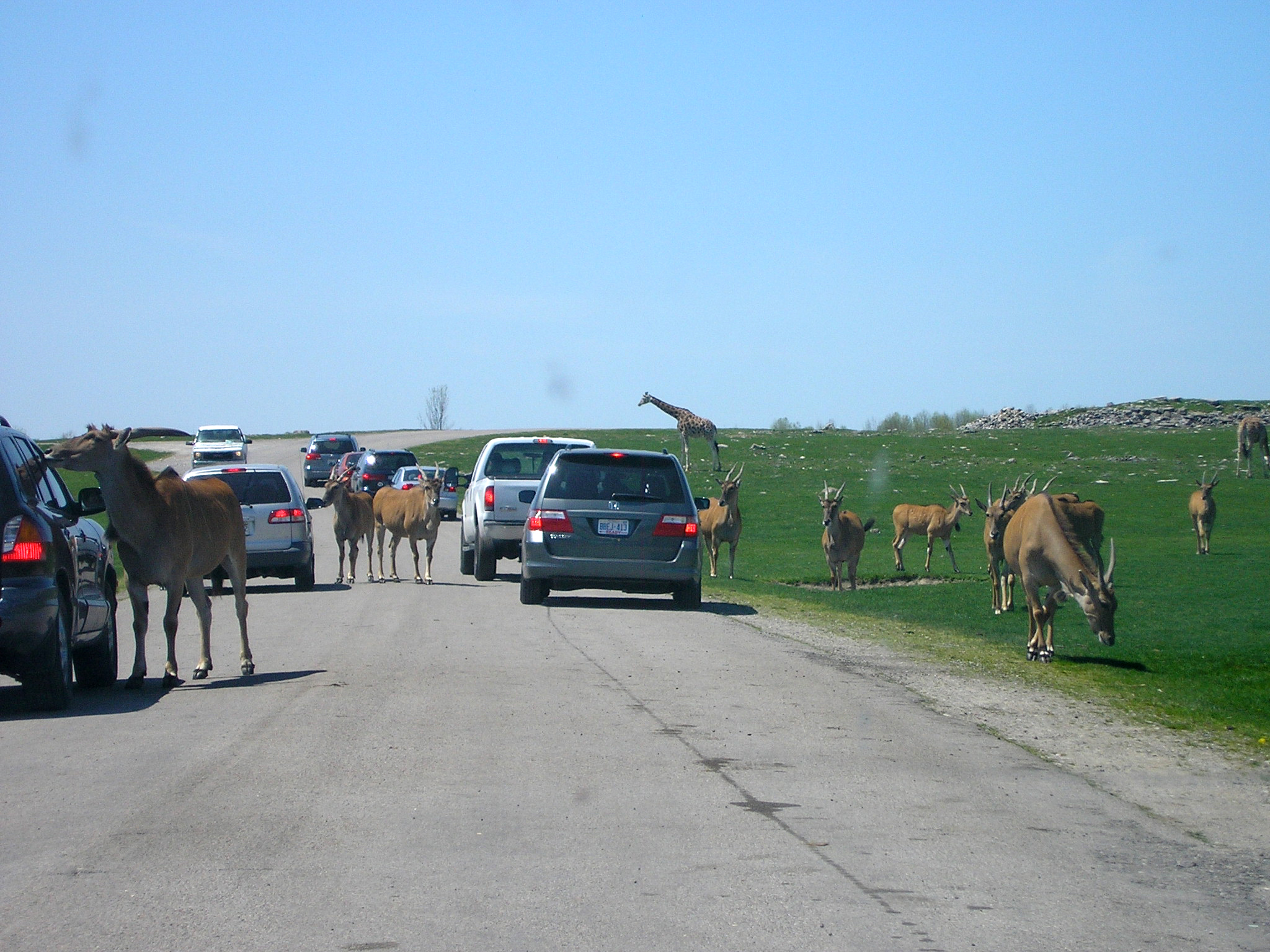
- Visitors in the reserves
- Interactive map of African Lion Safari
- 43.341°N 80.180°W
- Date opened: August 22, 1969
- Location: 1386 Cooper Road, Hamilton, Ontario
- Land area: 300 hectares (740 acres)
- Memberships: Canadian Association of Zoos and Aquariums, WAZA, IEF, and IAATE
- Website: www.lionsafari.com

African Lion Safari is a family-owned safari park in Southern Ontario, Canada, located in the city of Hamilton, which is 100 kilometres (62 mi) west of Toronto. Guests may tour seven game reserves, with a total area of about 740 acres (300 hectares), on tour buses or in visitors' own vehicles, where animals roam freely in contained areas. Accompanying the game reserves is a walking section where exotic birds and primates, as well as the park's herd of Asian elephants, are on display.

African Lion Safari is an accredited member of the Canadian Association of Zoos and Aquariums, and is also a member of the World Association of Zoos and Aquariums (WAZA), the International Elephant Foundation (IEF) as well as the International Association of Avian Trainers and Educators (IAATE).

== History ==
This safari park was founded by Gordon Debenham "Don" Dailley, a retired Canadian Army colonel, and opened its doors on August 21, 1969. Dailley initially partnered with the Chipperfield family from England to purchase four farms in the Rockton, Ontario area totaling 250 hectares (620 acres). He bought out the Chipperfields in the early 1970s. It remains privately owned, and the only significant feature was the drive-through reserve. In 1971, the park began working with Asian elephants, and in 1985 they started to make a concentrated effort to breed Asian elephants. Over the years, successful breeding of 30 endangered species and 20 threatened species has occurred in the park.

== Exhibits ==
=== Reserves ===
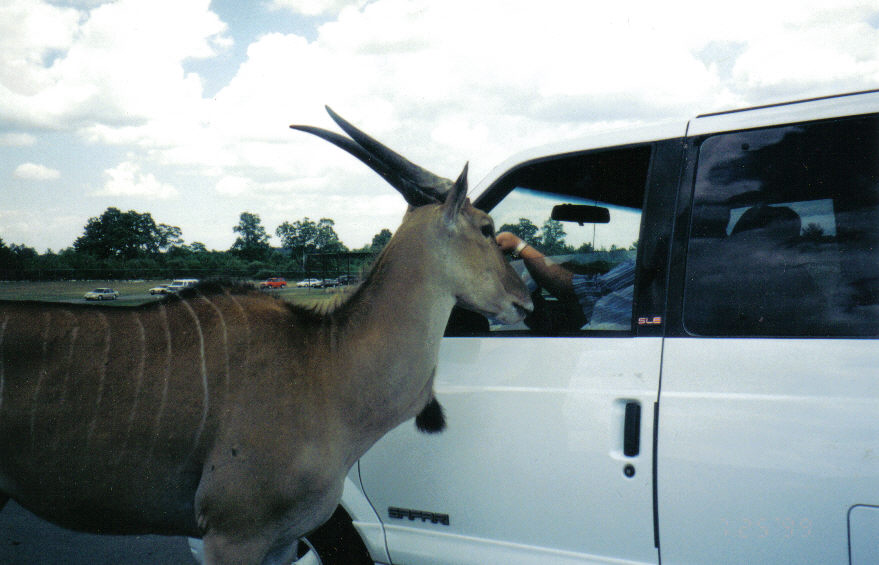
Common eland visiting tourist

On any of the seven reserves, visitors are caged in their car and the animals roam in large enclosures that range from 2 to 20 hectares (4.9 to 49.4 acres).

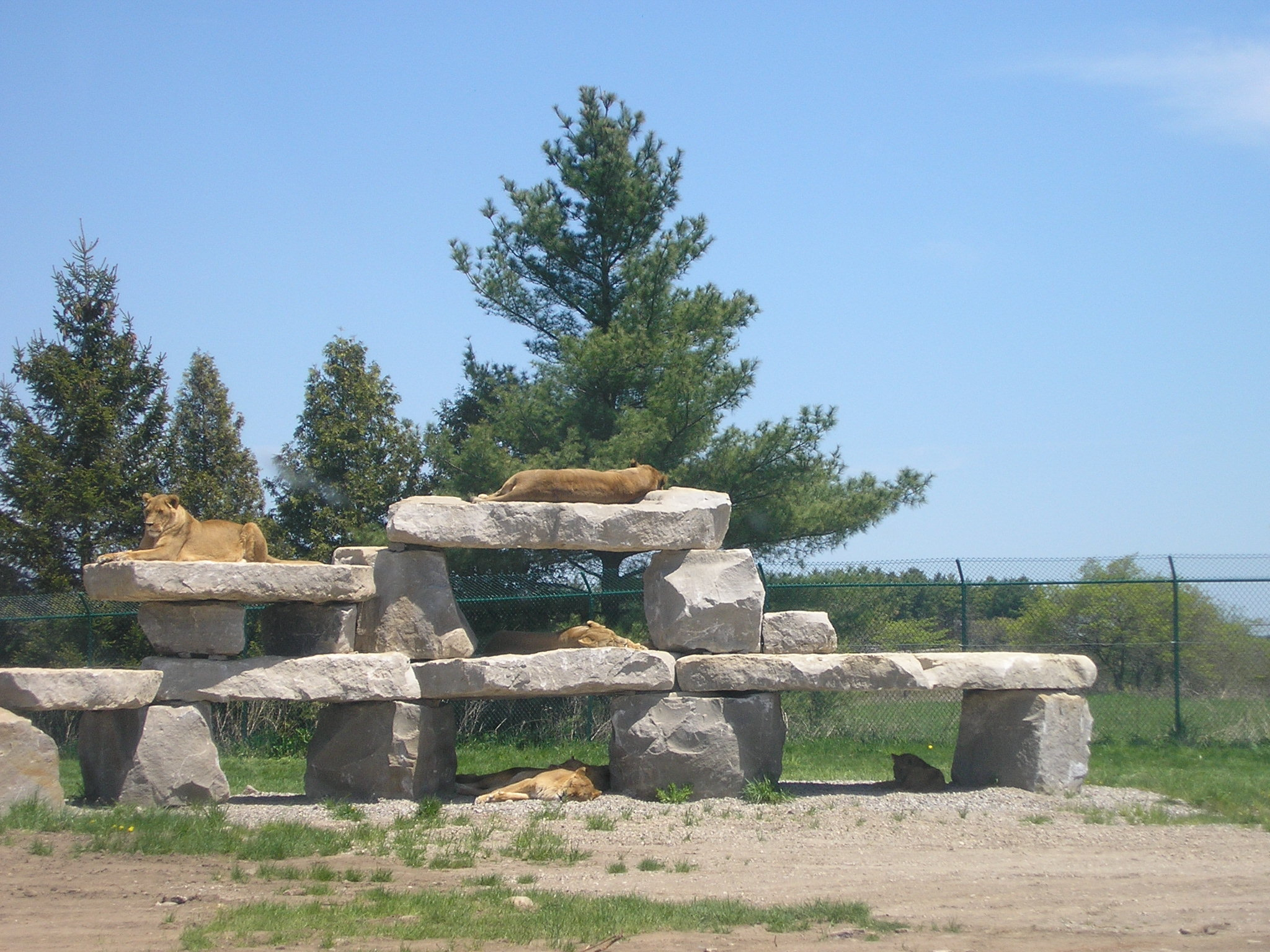
Lions resting

In the Nairobi Sanctuary, visitors can see Ankole-Watusi cattle, llamas, European white storks, Egyptian geese, and grey crowned cranes on a large open field with a pond.

Between the Nairobi Sanctuary and the Simba Lion Country is the cheetah breeding centre, which is home to cheetahs. There are several enclosures in the preserve where the cheetahs live either separately or grouped.

Simba Lion Country is home to African lions. In it exists a structure made out of rocks for the lions to rest or play on.

Timbavati Lion Country is home to white lions, also known as Timbavati lions. Much like Simba Lion Country, it too has a rock structure.

Wankie Bushland Trail is home to olive baboons, bongo, zebu, and Malayan tapirs. The baboons' tower is a house and a playground for them.

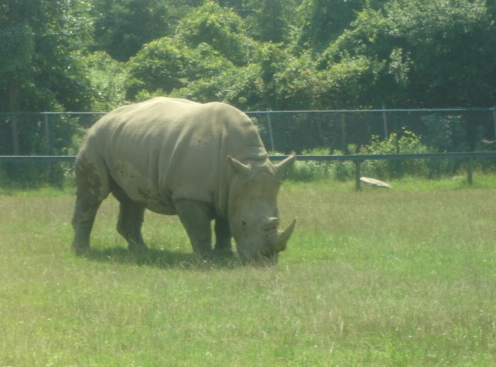
Rhino grazing at the African Lion Safari

The Rocky Ridge Veldt includes Rothschild's giraffes, Grant's zebras, wildebeest, Common eland, Barbary sheep, ostrich, southern white rhinoceroses, addax, and scimitar oryx. Inside this open field are shelters, shade structures, and several piles of rocks for animals to climb on.

The Australasia reserve includes Himalayan tahr, yak, nilgai, Indian rhinoceroses, western grey kangaroos, red kangaroos, red-necked wallabies, and Sicilian donkeys. In smaller fenced areas on the periphery of this reserve are enclosures for Turkmenian (Bukharan) markhor and Sichuan takin. This reserve is a mix of trees, grass and pond.

The North America reserve is home to American bison, elk, fallow deer, and markhor. There are two feeding areas on this large open field.

=== Walking Trail ===
The "African Queen" Boat Cruise houses animals like ring-tailed lemurs, ruffed lemurs, white-handed gibbons, siamangs, black-handed spider monkeys, squirrel monkeys, black swans, and a pink-backed pelican. There is also a boat you ride on to see these animals up close.

The "Nature Boy" Scenic Railway houses animals like Asian elephants, camels, boreal woodland caribou, and fallow deer. There is also a train you ride to see these animals.

The Tusker Trail is the smallest selection of the zoo. Animals here include hippos, American flamingos, and sandhill cranes.

The Birds of Prey Conservation Centre houses birds like eagles, vultures, owls, falcons, hawks, marabou storks, and secretary birds.

The Kids' Zoo houses animals like black lemurs, macaws, alpacas, giant tortoises, pygmy goats, pot-bellied pigs, straw-coloured fruit bats, and tamanduas.

== Breeding programs ==
The park is involved in the International Species Survival Plans for Asian elephants, cheetahs, White rhinos, and Cinereous vultures. It has provided captive bred Barn owls, Burrowing owls, Trumpeter swans, Ferruginous hawks, and a Bald eagle to reintroduction programs for release into the wild.

The park currently claims to have the most successful Asian elephant breeding program in North America, and in 2008 became home to the first third generation Asian elephant in North America. It has received several CAZA awards, including those recognizing outstanding achievements in the care of both cheetahs and giraffes.

In 2010, "Jake" became African Lion Safari's first successful Asian elephant birth from an artificial insemination, and the first birth of this kind in Canada.

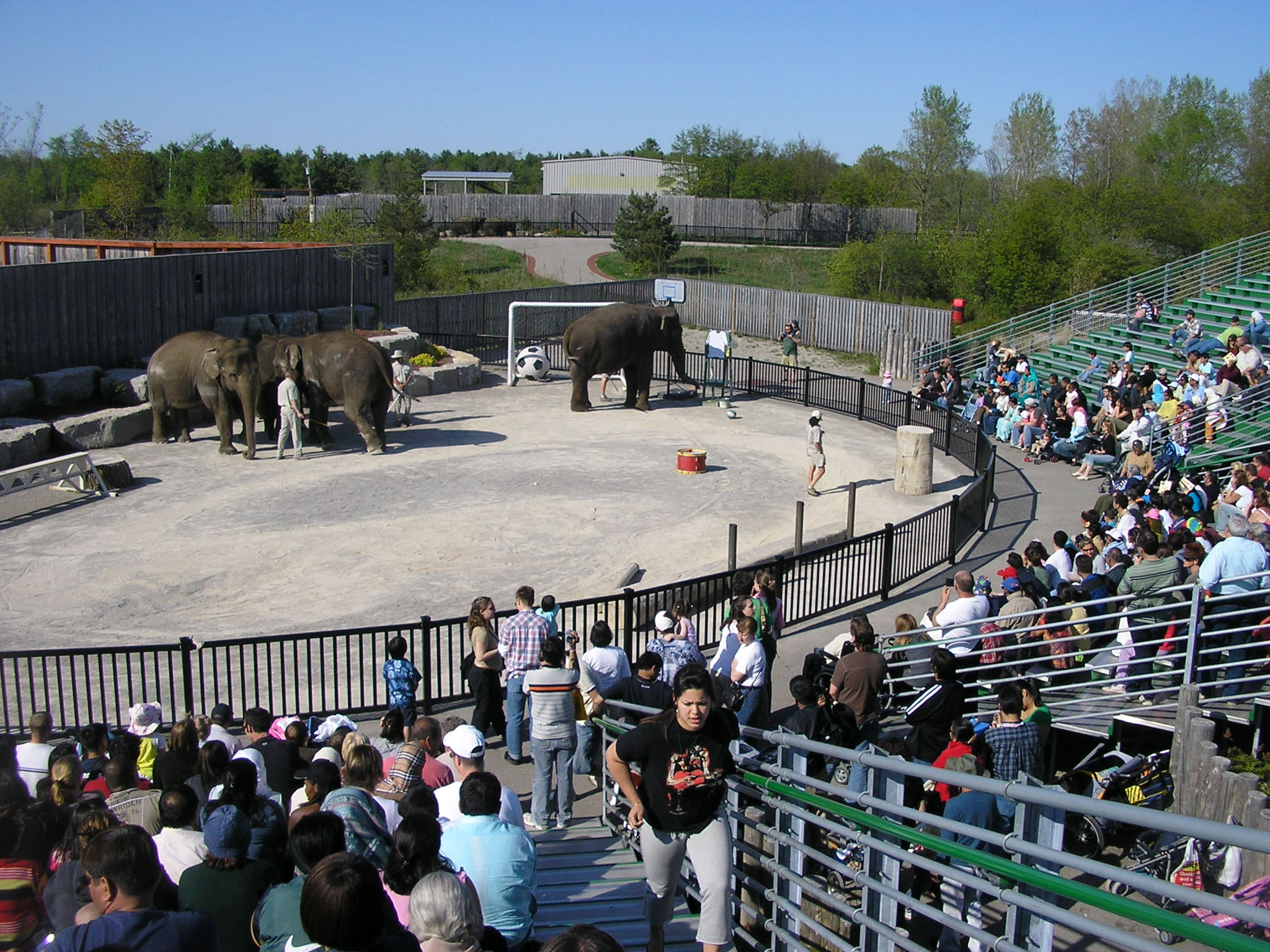
Demonstration of Asian elephants skills by staff

== Animal welfare ==
A demonstration was held at African Lion Safari on Saturday, May 4, 2013. Animal rights activists from the Grassroots Ontario Animal Liberation Network staged a protest during the Safari's opening day to raise awareness about issues surrounding the use of exotic animals for entertainment and to expose the park as a for-profit business based on animal exploitation. Activists also claimed that the use of bull hooks during elephant shows at the park were cruel and archaic.

In March 2021, animal protection organization In Defense of Animals named African Lion Safari as the worst zoo for elephants in its annual report, citing cruel training methods, exposure to Hamilton's harsh winter climate, constant zoo transfers, and breeding processes. Concerns were also expressed towards a plan to sell two elephants to Fort Worth Zoo - which ranked second on the said report - for $2,000,000.

== Incidents ==
In November 1989, 21-year-old Omer Norton, a part-time employee and biology student at McMaster University, was crushed to death by a five-ton bull elephant named Tusko. The incident occurred as Norton tried to intervene in a fight between Tusko and another elephant.

In April 1996, a couple driving through the game reserve were attacked by a Bengal tiger, an animal that is no longer exhibited by the zoo. The couple filed a lawsuit against the park, which took several years to resolve. Eventually, in January 2005, a court awarded them and their families $2.5 million as compensation.

In June 2019, a handler was airlifted to hospital after being attacked by Maggie, one of the park's elephants. According to a Ministry of Labour report, the aggressive elephant, Maggie, three meters tall and weighing 3,900 kilograms, repeatedly struck, spun, and pushed her handler against the wooden railings of the platform stairway using her powerful trunk. Following this incident, African Lion Safari ended its elephant ride program.
