= Anchor Bay Entertainment =

American home entertainment and production company

Starboard Entertainment
- Formerly: Starz Home Entertainment (2007–2008, original); Anchor Bay Entertainment (2024–2026, revival)
- Type: Subsidiary
- Industry: Motion pictures Home video
- Predecessor: Video Treasures (1985–1998); Starmaker Entertainment (1988–1998); (original)
- Founded: May 1995; 31 years ago (original); February 15, 2024; 2 years ago (revival)
- Founders: Thomas Zambeck; Brian Katz; (revival)
- Defunct: 2017; 9 years ago (original)
- Fate: Folded into Lionsgate Home Entertainment (original)
- Successor: Lionsgate Home Entertainment (original)
- Headquarters: 500 Kirts Blvd, Troy, Michigan, U.S. (1995–1999, Original); Beverly Hills, California, U.S. (original); Los Angeles, California, U.S. (revival)
- Products: DVD, Blu-ray, LaserDisc, VHS (original)
- Owners: Thomas Zambeck; Brian Katz; (revival)
- Parent: Handleman Company (1995–2003, original); Starz Distribution (2003–2017, original); Umbrelic Entertainment (revival)
- Divisions: Anchor Bay Films (original)
- Website: Anchor Bay Entertainment at the Wayback Machine (archived May 18, 2017) (original) starboardfilms-ent.com

Starboard Entertainment is an American independent film production and distribution company owned by Umbrelic Entertainment co-founders Thomas Zambeck and Brian Katz. The company markets and releases "new release genre films, undiscovered treasures, cult classics, and remastered catalog releases".

Originally founded as Anchor Bay Entertainment in 1995 from a merger between two companies, Video Treasures and Starmaker Entertainment, the company first operated as a home entertainment distributor, which would later be acquired in 2003 by Starz Distribution, a then-subsidiary of Lionsgate. Anchor Bay Entertainment marketed and released feature films, television series, television specials and short films on DVD and Blu-ray. In 2004, Anchor Bay agreed to have its releases distributed by 20th Century Fox Home Entertainment and renewed their deal in 2011. In 2017, Lionsgate folded Anchor Bay Entertainment into Lionsgate Home Entertainment. The company would later see a revival in 2024 under new owners Zambeck and Katz, after the two acquired the rights to the Anchor Bay name.

== History ==
=== As Anchor Bay Entertainment ===
The first incarnation of Anchor Bay Entertainment dates its origins back to two separate home video distributors: Video Treasures, formed in 1985, and Starmaker Entertainment, founded in 1988. Both companies sold budget items, including reissues of previously released home video programming, at discount prices.

Video Treasures started with public domain titles, and later made licensing deals with Color Systems Technology, Vestron Video, Heron Communications (including Media Home Entertainment and Hi-Tops Video), Britt Allcroft (specifically the Thomas the Tank Engine series, which was inherited from Strand Home Video when Video Treasures purchased that label from Video Collection International in December 1993), Trans World Entertainment, Regal Video, Virgin Vision, Hal Roach Studios, Video Communications Inc., Jerry Lewis Productions, and Orion Pictures, among others.

Starmaker's major distributions were films from the then-recently, out-of-business New World Pictures and programs previously licensed to New World Pictures' video division. The rights to these titles were secured in 1990. Viacom-produced programs and Saturday Night Live compilations were other notable Starmaker releases.

Both companies competed with each other for years. In January 1989, Video Treasures was acquired by the Handleman Company. In August 1991, Video Treasures acquired MNTEX Entertainment, a discount VHS distributor based in Prior Lake, Minnesota.

In June 1994, Starmaker Entertainment was acquired by Handleman as well. Eventually, both companies merged to form a new corporate umbrella: Anchor Bay Entertainment, in May 1995. Other budget home video and music labels became part of Anchor Bay, such as MNTEX Entertainment, Teal Entertainment, and Burbank Video, which were previously part of Video Treasures. Both the Video Treasures and Starmaker labels, along with the MNTEX and Burbank Video labels, were phased out a couple years later.

Top: First logo for the original company from 1995 until 2008.
Bottom: Final logo for the original company from 2009 until 2017.

In the late 1990s and early 2000s, Anchor Bay specialized in the release of horror films, particularly cult films and slasher films from the 1970s and 1980s. One of its first releases was Prom Night. It also released Halloween (as well as its 4th, and 5th sequels), Hellraiser, and many others, leading the home video market for obscure and vintage horror films.

In October 2000, Anchor Bay Entertainment expanded to the United Kingdom, the first non-North American country to release film and TV on home media.

In 2003, Handleman sold Anchor Bay to IDT Entertainment, at the time a newly-formed entertainment division of telecommunications company IDT Corporation. On February 4, 2005, the Securities and Exchange Commission filed civil charges against two former employees of Anchor Bay Entertainment, formerly owned by Handleman. The SEC's complaint, which was filed in the United States District Court for the Eastern District of Michigan, claims that the two employees caused the company to enter into a two million-dollar fraudulent transactions. The transactions involved the purported sale of slow-moving or obsolete inventory to business partners doubled with secret buy-back provisions. The inventory included worthless video boxes and sleeves and DVDs for films. Handleman subsequently restated its financial statements to correct these accounting errors.

In 2004, it signed a licensing agreement with Stephen J. Cannell Productions to release its library on DVD. In 2005, it signed a deal with The Carsey-Werner Company to release many television series on DVD. In 2006, it attempted an agreement with Ember Entertainment Group to release The Man from U.N.C.L.E. and The Girl from U.N.C.L.E. on DVD, but it was prevented by a lawsuit from Warner Bros., who said it owned both series.

In 2006, Colorado-based Liberty Media, the owner of the digital cable/pay-TV network Starz, purchased IDT Entertainment from IDT Corporation and renamed as Starz Media.

In May 2007, Anchor Bay was renamed as Starz Home Entertainment. A month later, it was announced on June 19, 2007, that Starz Home Entertainment would begin releasing high-definition versions of its films exclusively in the Blu-ray format. In 2008, Starz Home Entertainment reverted to its original Anchor Bay name.

During the late 2000s, Sony Pictures Home Entertainment had a three-year deal with Anchor Bay Entertainment for worldwide DVD releases outside of North America, Australia, and the United Kingdom.

On January 4, 2011, Starz, LLC sold 25% of Starz Media to The Weinstein Company, resulting in Anchor Bay becoming the video distributor of films made by TWC and Dimension (Disney's former subdivision). Starz later bought back the Weinstein's stake in October 2015, with Anchor Bay continuing to release TWC and Dimension video releases.

In early 2015, Anchor Bay UK (along with Manga Entertainment UK) was bought from Starz by managing director Colin Lomax and renamed to Platform Entertainment. Kaleidoscope Film Distribution would acquire Platform in December 2016, with Manga Entertainment UK becoming a separate entity and operating on its own, which itself was eventually acquired by the anime company Funimation in 2019.

On June 30, 2016, Lionsgate agreed to acquire Anchor Bay's parent company Starz Inc. for $4.4 billion in cash and stock. The Starz/Lionsgate merger was completed on December 8, 2016. On August 29, 2017, Anchor Bay was folded into Lionsgate Home Entertainment. From August 30, 2017 to 2021, Anchor Bay's website remained online, but with all the links broken.

On February 15, 2024, Thomas Zambeck and Brian Katz, co-founders of Umbrelic Entertainment (founded in 2018), acquired the rights to the Anchor Bay Entertainment name from Lionsgate, with the two planning to relaunch the company. The new company will specialize in "genre films, undiscovered treasures, cult classics, and remastered catalog releases", with distribution being handled by MVD Entertainment Group. The puppet horror film Abruptio and documentary Dinner with Leatherface are some of the label's first releases. The library of the original Anchor Bay incarnation was retained by Lionsgate.

=== As Starboard Entertainment ===
In summer 2026, the revived Anchor Bay Entertainment rebranded as Starboard Entertainment due to rights issues with Lionsgate. The rebrand will expand into genres outside of horror for global appeal.

== Licensed content ==
=== Films ===
- Most of the libraries of EMI Films, and Alexander Salkind (via StudioCanal) (now handled by Lionsgate)
- Select 20th Century Fox titles under license from 20th Century Fox Home Entertainment
- Some of the Universal Pictures films under license from Universal Pictures Home Entertainment such as Army of Darkness, The Car and Repo Man, although licensing on these have reverted to Universal Pictures Home Entertainment.
- Davis-Panzer Productions (The Osterman Weekend)
- Moustapha Akkad's Trancas International Pictures (production company behind the Halloween series)
- New World Pictures (The Boys Next Door, Children of the Corn, Creepshow 2, Girls Just Want to Have Fun, Heathers, Godzilla 1985, etc.) (now handled by Image Entertainment through their deal with Lakeshore Entertainment)
- Most of the 1950s–1980s Walt Disney Productions/Walt Disney Pictures live-action library, as well as the film library of American Broadcasting Company, under license from Walt Disney Studios Home Entertainment (The Black Hole, The Cat from Outer Space, Condorman, One Magic Christmas, The Devil and Max Devlin, The Happiest Millionaire, The Great Locomotive Chase, Return to Oz, Tex, The North Avenue Irregulars, The Watcher in the Woods, etc.), although licensing has reverted to Walt Disney Studios Home Entertainment, while the ABC library has been distributed by MGM Home Entertainment and Kino Lorber at different points.
- Overture Films, also owned by Starz Distribution
- The Weinstein Company (now Lantern Entertainment) and Dimension Films (formerly owned by Disney) from March 2011 until Anchor Bay went defunct in 2017 (now handled by Lionsgate)
- The libraries of Media Home Entertainment, Prism Entertainment, Wizard Video and Regal Video
- Worked along with Troma Entertainment in re-releasing some of their older films on Blu-ray as well as distributing Return to Nuke 'Em High.
- Against the Wild duology, from writer/director, Richard Boddington

=== Horror ===
During its original incarnation in the late 1990s and early 2000s, Anchor Bay specialized in the release of horror and cult films, particularly those of the 1970s and 1980s. The company's first-ever DVD release was The Car in April 1997, followed by Elvira, Mistress of the Dark that August, and an extended cut (erroneously titled as a director's cut) of Dawn of the Dead in November 1997. The company's next release was Prom Night in February 1998.

It also released Halloween (as well as its third and fourth sequels), Sleepaway Camp, Alice, Sweet Alice, The Hills Have Eyes, Suspiria, Maniac, the first three Hellraiser films, The Wicker Man, Silent Night, Deadly Night, Children of the Corn, The Beyond and several Lucio Fulci films. Some of these were given numbered limited edition releases which included multiple discs, information booklets and collectible tin cases. Many of these releases have since gone out of print and became sought-after collectibles.

Anchor Bay is also noted for the release of the Evil Dead film trilogy on DVD, in numerous editions. Army of Darkness for example, had been released in both a regular and limited edition set that featured the director's cut. Since then, the director's cut has been re-released on two occasions in addition to a two-disc "Boomstick Edition" of the film as well. Until Anchor Bay released The Evil Dead on VHS and DVD, it was previously unavailable on video from a major label.

Also among its more profitable releases has been George A. Romero's Living Dead series. Anchor Bay has distribution rights for the middle two films in the tetralogy: Dawn and Day, however, it has also distributed DVDs of the original, Night of the Living Dead, which is in the public domain. Like the Evil Dead trilogy, the Living Dead series has seen many editions on DVD. Dawn has itself seen several releases on DVD, the most extra feature-laden being the Ultimate Edition in late 2004. An Evil Dead 3-disc Ultimate Edition DVD was released in December 2007.

=== Special interest ===
In addition to feature films, Anchor Bay distributed special interest titles, including children's series, such as Bobby's World, Mighty Machines, Chuggington, and PBS's Mister Rogers' Neighborhood. Until 2008, one of these distributed franchises included Thomas & Friends videos (original series only, new series titles were self-released by HIT Entertainment). Thomas has reached platinum-selling status and, in 2004, ranked consistently on the VideoScan ranking, following its "top 50" chart of children's weekly video sales. Lionsgate acquired the Thomas DVD titles after HIT Entertainment bought out the rights to Thomas. Rights to the Thomas DVDs now belong to Universal (through their deal with Mattel, HIT's current parent company). The company also has a top market share for fitness videos such as the Crunch and For Dummies series. The company also distributed UFC events on DVD and Blu-ray.

=== Production company ===
As a full-fledged production company, it handled TV syndication of Halloween, Halloween 4 and Halloween 5 (to which it also held the video rights) and also ventured into in-house production and distribution of theatrical films.

== Recognition ==
Anchor Bay Entertainment received a Special Achievement Award from the Academy of Science Fiction, Fantasy & Horror Films in June 2002. Anchor Bay was recognized as one of the "pioneers in DVD releases and home video entertainment" and "successful in releasing dramas, comedies, foreign films, children's programming, and most prominently genre films." Cited as highlights of Anchor Bay's releases were "the films of Hammer Studios, the works of Werner Herzog, Paul Verhoeven, Wim Wenders, John Woo, Monte Hellman and Sam Raimi".

== Past names ==
- Video Treasures
- Starmaker Entertainment
- MNTEX Entertainment
- Teal Entertainment
- Burbank Video
- Troy Gold
- Viking Video Classics
- Drive Entertainment
- GTS Records
- Media Home Entertainment
- Strand Home Video
- Anchor Bay Films

== See also ==
- List of films released by Anchor Bay Entertainment
