= An Elephant's Journey =

An Elephant's Journey may refer to:

- Phoenix Wilder and the Great Elephant Adventure, a 2017 children's film also released with the title An Elephant's Journey
- The Elephant's Journey, a Portuguese children's book by José Saramago
