= Orangeville District Secondary School =

School in Ontario, Canada

Coordinates: 43.92364°N 80.10353°W

Orangeville District Secondary School is located at 22 Faulkner Street in Orangeville, Ontario, Canada, and is the oldest secondary school in the town. It was built in its current state after the old high school (originally built in 1884) burned down in 1948. Currently, grades 9 through 12 are housed at O.D.S.S. There are 1,500 students that attend this school.

Famous graduates include professional wrestlers Adam Copeland and Jason Reso, better known as Edge and Christian Cage, Alex and Chris van den Hoef of DVBBS, NBA player Ignas Brazdeikis and Degrassi: The Next Generation actor Ryan Cooley. ODSS also provides the academic instruction for the Athlete Institute, an elite basketball prep school, which has recently featured 2016 NBA draft first-round picks Jamal Murray and Thon Maker, with Maker coming directly out of high school. Film director Richard Boddington graduated from ODSS in 1986.

== See also ==
- Education in Ontario
- List of secondary schools in Ontario
