= Fort Worth Zoo =

Zoo in Fort Worth, Texas, United States

- Interactive map of Fort Worth Zoo
- 32.7219°N 97.3566°W
- Date opened: 1909
- Location: Fort Worth, Texas, United States of America
- Land area: 64 acres (26 ha)
- No. of species: 542
- Memberships: AZA ZAA WAZA
- Website: www.fortworthzoo.org

The Fort Worth Zoo is a zoo in Fort Worth, Texas, United States, and is home to 7,000 native and exotic animals. It has been named as a top zoo in the nation by Family Life magazine, the Los Angeles Times and USA Today, as well as one of the top zoos in the South by Southern Living Reader's Choice Awards.

The Fort Worth Zoo is accredited by both the Association of Zoos and Aquariums (AZA) and Zoological Association of America (ZAA), and is a member of the World Association of Zoos and Aquariums (WAZA).

== History ==
When the Fort Worth Zoo opened in 1909, it had one African lion, two bear cubs, an alligator, a coyote, a peacock and a few rabbits. From its opening until 1991, the zoo was owned and operated by the City of Fort Worth. Although the city collected money from the community to purchase new animals, the Zoological society (now the Fort Worth Zoological Association) was formed in 1939 to help raise additional funds.

Monkey Island was built in 1937 with funds from the Works Progress Administration. After being refurbished in 1949, this exhibit became a sea lion pool, and by 1970, it had been converted to house small South American mammals. Storks and cranes were housed in this exhibit in the 1980s, and it was converted once again in the early 1990s to house alligators, it last converted in 2004 to house Parrots. It is currently being used to house Flamingos.

The Herpetarium was completed in the summer of 1960 and was an indoor exhibit measuring 117 by 55 feet (17 m). Boasting the largest exhibit of reptiles and amphibians in the world (with 175 vivaria and about 200 species), the facility also included a zoo hospital and quarantine room. Features such as refrigerated air, operational skylights, temperature controlled water, switch operated emergency alarms, and state-of-the-art service facilities, made the Herpetarium a marvel of technology for its time. Innovative exhibits such as a display of giant snakes with curved non-reflective glass (creating the illusion of an open-fronted exhibit) were especially popular attractions. The main public area included five exhibit halls covering various geographic regions and another area that was devoted exclusively to amphibians. There were also special exhibits teaching the identification of native venomous snakes and treatment for snakebite.

In October 1991, the Fort Worth Zoological Association assumed management of the zoo under a contract with the city. In 1992, the zoo opened the first two of a series of exhibits: World of Primates and Asian Falls. During the rest of the decade, the zoo opened Raptor Canyon, Asian Rhino Ridge, an education center in 1993, a cheetah exhibit in 1994, Flamingo Bay, a Komodo dragon exhibit, Insect City in 1995, Meerkat Mounds in 1997, a new veterinary center in 1998, and Thundering Plains (now closed) in 1999.

The first decade of the new millennium saw the opening of Texas Wild! in 2001 to showcase native Texas animals, Parrot Paradise in 2004, Great Barrier Reef in 2005 as part of a renovated Australian Outback exhibit, and the penguin exhibit in 2008. This decade also saw the closing of the original Herpetarium in 2009 to be replaced by the Museum of Living Art in 2010.

== Future ==
In the autumn of 2016, the zoo announced its $100-million capital campaign: A Wilder Vision, which will include new exhibit space, renovated habitats, special events space, multiple dining areas, restrooms, and new ways to observe, interact with and learn about animals. The first step in this plan, a renovated African Savanna, opened in April 2018. The second step in this plan, an expanded elephant exhibit, opened in April 2021. The other upcoming projects are renovated exhibits for the various African and Asian carnivores, and a new Forests & Jungles section. Species here include the clouded leopard, African wild dog, Malayan tiger, African Lion, cheetah, striped hyena, and African leopard for the African and Asian Predators section, this area opened in June 2023. The okapi is the very first announced new species for the Forests & Jungles section, with a relocation of the Sumatran orangutans, jaguars, and the bongo. The planned opening date for the Forests & Jungles section is 2027.

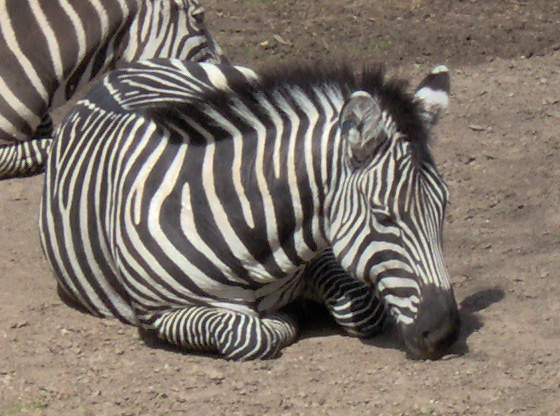
A zebra at Fort Worth Zoo, 2005

== Main exhibits ==
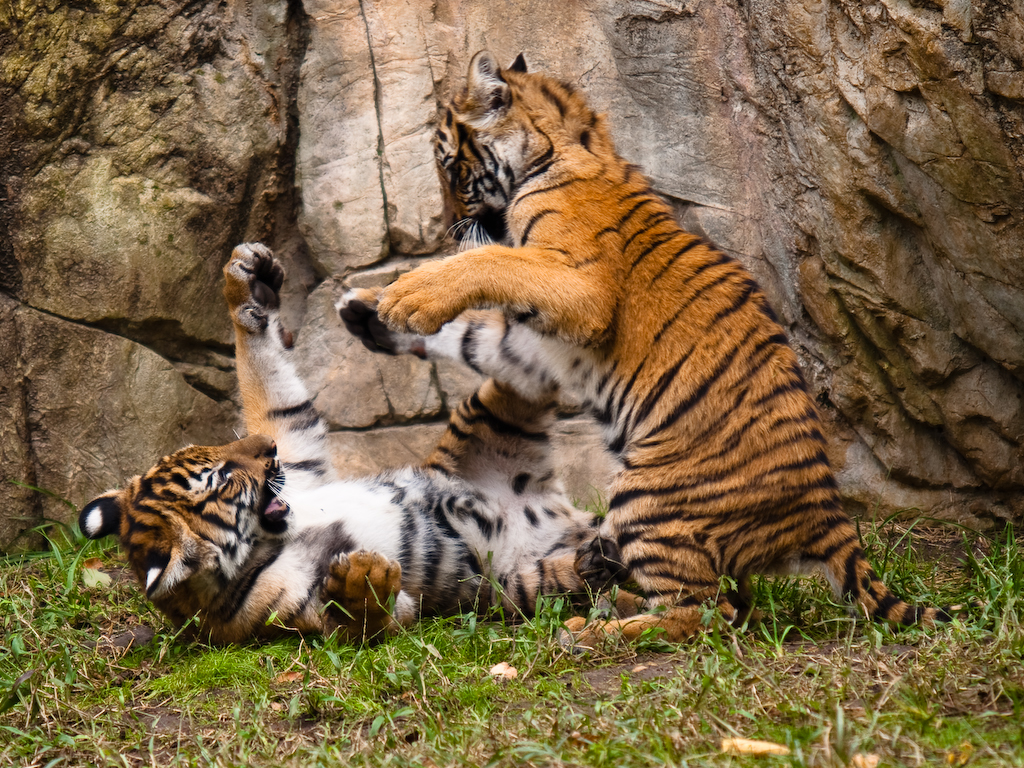
Two malayan tiger cubs playing

Current zoo exhibits include Penguins, World of Primates, the brand new Predators of Asia and Africa, Raptor Canyon, Flamingo Bay, Elephant Springs, Australian Outback, African Savanna, Texas Wild! and the Museum of Living Art (MOLA).

=== Penguins ===
This indoor exhibit is home to an indoor enclosure for southern rockhopper penguins and common eider, both include a beach and an underwater viewing area.

=== World of Primates ===
Opened in 1992, World of Primates is a 2.5-acre (1.0 ha) exhibit that includes both indoor and outdoor habitats. The atrium is a tropical rainforest that has since been turned into an aviary, in which visitors can observe several different bird species from around the world, as well as mantled guerezas. Once through the atrium, visitors take a winding boardwalk past other primates including the zoo's western lowland gorilla troop, Sumatran orangutans (a Bornean orangutan moved into the habitat), mandrills, bonobos, and Northern white-cheeked gibbons.

=== Elephant Springs ===
The all-new Elephant Springs was opened on April 15, 2021 (Originally opened in 1992 as half of the former Asian Falls) and includes a huge remodeled Asian elephant yard complex. Before getting to the elephants, visitors can go past the entrance and either go to the River Village or check out a viewing area that gives a better view of the Indian rhinoceros with a path leading to the Predators of Asia and Africa section. The exhibit also features a Demonstration Area for an elephant encounter show.

=== Predators of Asia and Africa ===
This new exhibit was opened on June 22, 2023. It includes huge yards for returning carnivores like lions, cheetahs, African wild dogs, and new addition of African leopards. The half that was formerly Asian Falls still displays Sumatran tigers, striped hyenas, as well as the new addition of clouded leopards. There are also several aviaries that are home to a variety of African and Asian birds, such as the lesser flamingo, as well as a yard for red-crowned cranes.

=== Raptor Canyon ===
Raptor Canyon is an aviary that opened in 1993 and is home to crowned eagles, Andean condors, king vultures, harpy eagles, cinereous vultures, African fish eagles, and palm-nut vultures.

=== Flamingo Bay ===
Flamingo Bay is home to two of the four species of flamingos at the zoo. The exhibit includes two species of flamingo, the American flamingos and Chilean flamingos with both, as well the zoo's greater and lesser flamingos, being successfully bred.

=== Australian Outback/Great Barrier Reef ===
This exhibit has been renovated and now includes the Great Barrier Reef exhibit in addition to being home to the zoo's galah, red kangaroos & Australian brushturkey The Great Barrier Reef exhibit is a collection of Australian aquatic animals in three tanks containing more than 10,000 US gallons (38,000 L; 8,300 imp gal) of water. The exhibit includes 500 animals representing 86 species, including clownfish, angelfish, brain corals, stingrays and sea apples.

=== African Savanna ===
Opened in 2018, the African Savanna allows guests to see reticulated giraffes, lesser kudu, springbok, ostriches, southern ground hornbills, Cape vulture, pink-backed pelicans, and helmeted guineafowl from multiple viewing spots, including an elevated boardwalk that allows giraffe feeding. There are also several paddocks for southern black rhinos and zebras, an above and underwater viewing area of the hippopotamus, a greater flamingo pond, the zoo's meerkat mob, and an aviary of several different species of African birds.

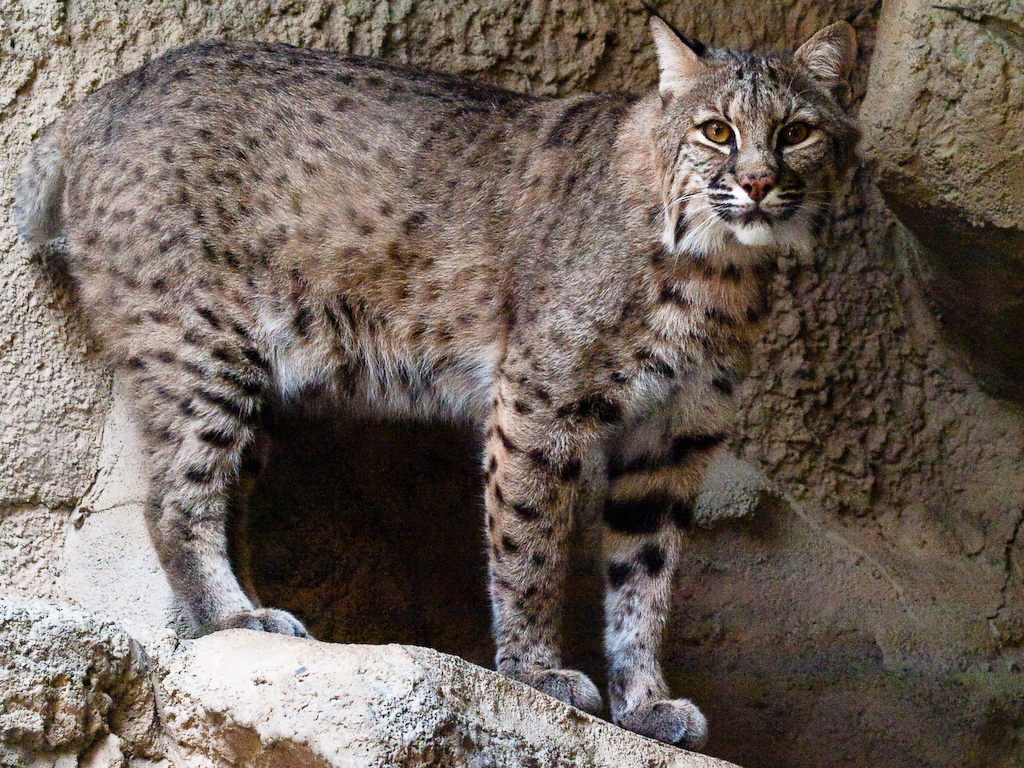
Bobcat in Texas Wild!

=== Texas Wild! ===
Texas Wild! was opened in 2001 to display various animals native to Texas. This section includes Texas Town, which has a play barn, a carousel, and the Texas Hall of Wonders. The High Plains and Prairies section represents the Panhandle and Northwestern Texas. It is home to swift foxes, greater roadrunners, burrowing owls, and black-tailed prairie dog, white-tailed deer, and wild turkey. Pineywoods and Swamps represents East Texas. This section of the exhibit includes red wolves, North American river otters, American alligators, and American black bears. Gulf Coast is home to Southern Texas animals including the aquatic animals and waterfowl of the delta marsh, and includes an aviary that is home to birds including the roseate spoonbill and American white pelicans and brown pelicans. Brush Country represents Southern Texas. This section includes bobcats, cougars, coyotes, jaguars, ocelots, ring-tailed cats, and white-nosed coati, as well as several native species of birds of prey such as the bald eagle. The Mountains and Desert area of Texas Wild! is currently under construction, being remodeled into a new area focused on education and conservation.

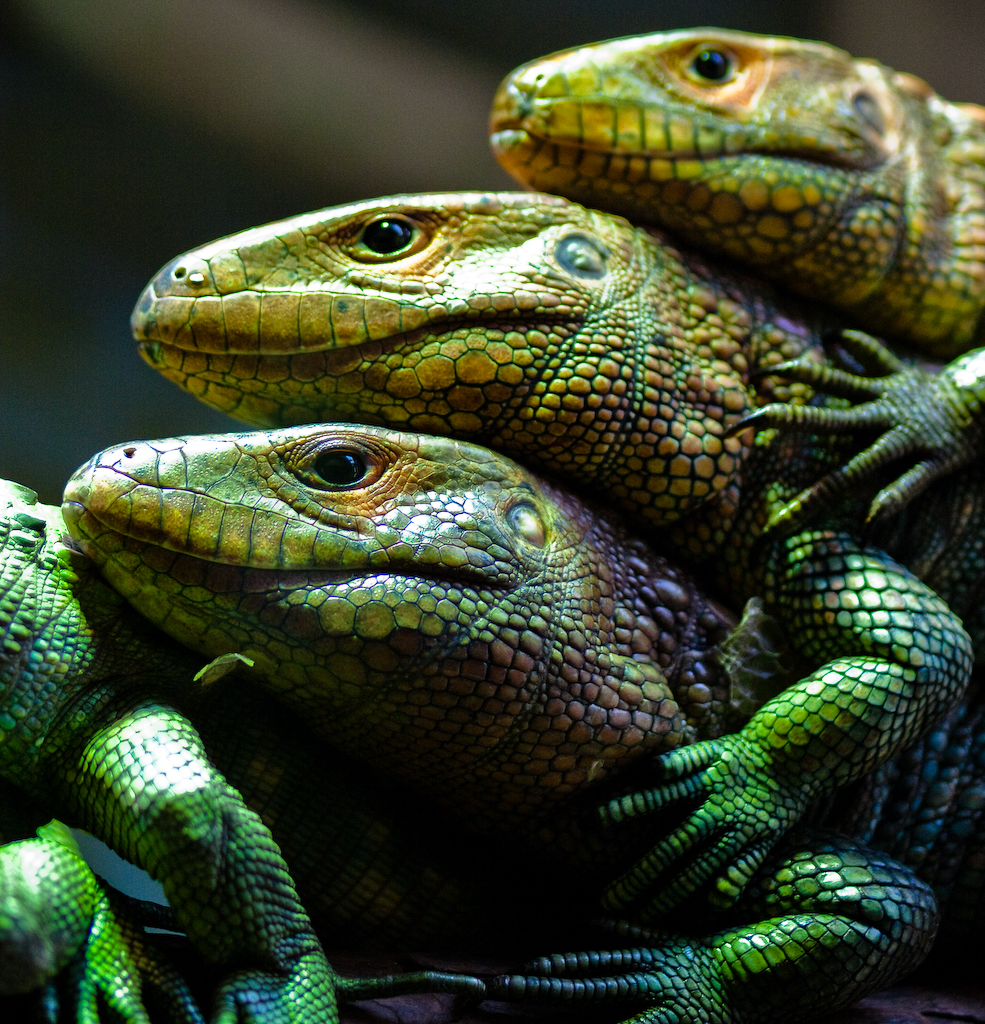
Caiman lizards

=== Museum of Living Art (MOLA) ===
The Museum of Living Art is a $19 million, 30,000-square-foot (2,800 m^{2}) herpetarium built to replace the original herpetarium at the zoo. The facility houses more than 5,000 animals representing more than 100 species from across the world. Residents include a saltwater crocodile, a blue iguana, Aldabra giant tortoises, a Burmese python, pig-nosed turtles, ring-tailed lemurs, gharials, a crocodile monitor, a hellbender, and a king cobra. The zoo's Komodo dragons are located here as well.

== Conservation ==
The Fort Worth Zoo administers the Arthur A. Seeligson Jr. Conservation Fund (SCF), which supports conservation of native wildlife within Texas through grants towards scientists, educators, organizations, and landowners who work to conserve the biodiversity of Texas. Money from this fund has gone towards multiple projects such as training search dogs to locate Houston toads, genetic assessments for ornate box turtle populations, and development for conservation strategies for alligator snapping turtles.

The zoo and their conservation biologists also host and are a part of many conservation projects, such as projects seeking to increase populations for the Anegada rock iguana, Panamanian golden frog, Louisiana pine snake, Texas kangaroo rat, and many more species.

The Fort Worth Zoo is partnered with multiple other conservation groups, such as the International Elephant Foundation, the International Rhino Foundation, the Turtle Survival Alliance, and multiple other conservation groups doing work in over 30 countries.

== Art ==
The zoo features a 40-foot iguana sculpture named Iggy that was lowered by helicopter onto the roof of the animal hospital in June 2010. Created by Austin artist Bob "Daddy-O" Wade, the sculpture is owned by Fort Worth oilman Lee M. Bass.
