= An American Girl: Isabelle Dances Into the Spotlight =

- Cover art for the film
- Directed by: Vince Marcello
- Screenplay by: Jessica O'Toole; Amy Rardin
- Based on: Isabelle by Laurence Yep
- Starring: Erin Pitt; Melora Hardin; Grace Davidson; Devyn Nekoda; Genneya Walton; Alyssa Trask; Daniel Fathers; Tanya Howard
- Music by: Patrick Kirst
- Production companies: Universal Studios; Martin Chase Productions; Pinckney Productions
- Distributed by: Universal Pictures Home Entertainment
- Release date: July 22, 2014
- Running time: 99 minutes
- Country: United States
- Language: English

An American Girl: Isabelle Dances Into the Spotlight is a 2014 musical family direct-to-video film, starring Erin Pitt as Isabelle Palmer; along with Melora Hardin, Grace Davidson, Devyn Nekoda, Genneya Walton, Alyssa Trask, Daniel Fathers, and Saara Chaudry. The eighth film in the American Girl series, it was directed by Vince Marcello with a screenplay by Jessica O'Toole and Amy Rardin.

An American Girl: Isabelle Dances Into the Spotlight was released on video on July 22, 2014, before being broadcast on Disney Channel on August 9, 2014.

== Plot ==
Isabelle Palmer, a 9-year-old dancer and aspiring fashion designer from Washington, D.C., studies at Anna Hart Performing Arts School with her older sister Jade and her best friend Luisa. Although Isabelle loves her sister, she often gets compared to her by rival classmate Renata.

She learns that The Nutcracker at Capital One Hall is casting Anna Hart students and will be starring Jacqueline "Jackie" Sanchez, the sisters' favorite dancer. At a Halloween dance benefit, she falls down during the performance. However, her spirits are lifted after signing an autograph for Chloe, a handicapped girl, and teaching her ballet moves.

Isabelle and Jade both audition for the Nutcracker, with the latter getting the lead role of Clara. Isabelle gets selected to dance in three scenes, even though she thought her performance wasn't good enough. Their dance instructor informs the students that they are eligible to compete for spots in a summer program at the American Ballet Theatre. The winners will be selected by Jackie and Mr. Koslof, the show's director. Isabelle is determined to get the 4th grade spot despite Renata's attempts to demotivate her. The sisters are delighted to learn that their mother, Nancy, will be a costume designer and hires Isabelle as her assistant.

When rehearsals begin, Isabelle is slow but picks up the choreography for the first two scenes she's scheduled for. However, she has difficulties learning the choreography for the Waltz of the Snowflakes. Jackie meets Isabelle after rehearsal and helps her get the hang of it. She later sees Renata looking upset after her mother calls her to say she can't pick her up for an ice-skating date she planned. Isabelle offers her a ride home, but she refuses, rudely telling her she should only focus on the show. The sisters are later given a gift by their parents, their own nutcracker.

Koslof recognizes Isabelle's improvement during their first theater rehearsal. However, Renata overhears him talking about switching the choreography for the snowflake waltz. After she offers a few suggestions, he then adds a new ending that includes a double pirouette. Isabelle falls during the first attempt and overhears Koslof talking with Jackie saying that if she doesn't get the turns, he might cut her from the scene and give the 4th grade spot to Renata.

After beating Renata in a cafeteria dance off, Isabelle is surprised when she offers her respect. However, she then takes it to say she only got into Anna Hart and the Nutcracker because of Jade. Isabelle runs off crying while Jade tells Renata to leave her sister alone. However, Isabelle gets angry and blames Jade for all of her struggles, saying she wants to drop out of the show and Anna Hart too. Jade then gets angry and says no one ever tries to offer her support because everyone thinks she's perfect. Isabelle storms off and accidentally breaks their nutcracker.

Jade has a talk with her mother and admits her frustrations. Her mother tells her no one expects her to be perfect and says they'll be there if she ever feels pressured. Isabelle fakes illness to miss rehearsals.

Jackie arrives at Isabelle's house and has a talk with her. Isabelle admits her concerns about getting in the show because of Jade. Jackie said she got in because she told Koslof about her meeting with Chloe, which she witnessed. She tells Isabelle it's just as good to inspire others than just be a flawless dancer. She admits to Isabelle her struggles and how they can forget them by remembering they're just doing the thing they love.

Inspired, Isabelle returns to the show, reconciles with Jade, and tells Renata she won't care what she thinks of her anymore. Isabelle slowly gets the new choreography but still struggles to get the double pirouette.

On opening night, Isabelle and Jade help Renata fix her dress before the show. Renata apologizes for everything she said and admits she was jealous of her relationship with Jade. She also admits she lied about her family activities and says that her parents aren't attending the show. Isabelle suggests she tells her family how she feels. Renata tells Isabelle she is a good dancer.

During the show, Isabelle performs well in the party and the fight scenes. However, she still feels nervous about the snowflake waltz. However, with last minute encouragement from Jade and Jackie, she lands the double pirouette and the show is successful.

Later when the winners of the summer program spots are announced, Isabelle and Jade got in. Renata did not, however, she tells them after talking with her parents they planned a summer family vacation to make up not being there for her. The dancers go out and celebrate during a snow flurry with Isabelle dancing with full confidence.

== Cast ==
- Erin Pitt as Isabelle Palmer, a 9-year-old dancer and aspiring fashion designer
- Grace Davidson as Jade Palmer, Isabelle's 12-year-old older sister
- Genneya Walton as Renata, a rich and spoiled girl who bullies Isabelle
- Devyn Nekoda as Luisa, Isabelle's best friend who is very into modern dance
- Melora Hardin as Nancy Palmer, Isabelle's mother who is a textile artist
- Tanya Howard as Jacqueline 'Jackie' Sanchez, a famous ballerina whom Isabelle and Jade look up to
- Daniel Fathers as Mr. Kosloff, the very strict director of The Nutcracker production
- Jake Simons as Leonardo 'Leo' Palmer, Isabelle's father who is a hospital administrator, and also plays the drums in a band
- Alyssa Trask as Emma, Renata's friend who also bullies Isabelle when on by Renata's side
- Saara Chaudry as Chloe, a girl in a wheelchair who looks up to Isabelle
- Jessica Gower as Auditions dancer

== Production ==
The film was shot in Toronto, Ontario, Canada.

== Release ==
The direct-to-DVD film was released on DVD and Blu-ray on July 22, 2014, and aired on the Disney Channel on August 9, 2014.

== Awards ==
In 2014, the film received the National Parenting Publications (NAPPA) Silver Award. The association enjoyed the film because of the cast, sets, and performances. They stated "It is truly outstanding – particularly the ballet performances". The director of the film, Vince Marcello, was also nominated for a Directors Guild of America Award in 2014. He was nominated for an Outstanding Directorial Achievement in Children's Programs award but he did not win.
