= Rob the Robot (TV series) =

Animated children's television series

- Created by: Manuel Rosen
- Based on: Rob the Robot series by John Magart
- Developed by: Chantal Ling; Barbara Mackey Ward; Peter Sauder; Jonathan Wiseman; Phillip Stamp; Craig Young
- Starring: Stacey DePass; Camden Angelis; Jake Beale; Jordi Mand; John Stocker
- Composer: Serge R. Coté
- Countries of origin: Canada; Singapore; United Kingdom
- Original language: English
- No. of seasons: 2
- No. of episodes: 104

Production
- Executive producers: Sheldon S. Wiseman; Anurag Srivastava; Phillip Stamp (S1); Steven Read; Jonathan Wiseman
- Producers: Chantal Ling (S1); Phillip Stamp (S1); Steven Read (S1); Craig Young (S2); Alexis Lewington (S2); Jeremy Hall (S2); Jonathan Wiseman (S2)
- Running time: 11 minutes
- Production companies: Amberwood Entertainment; One Animation (Note: Original distribution rights belong to Entertainment One. Current distribution rights belong to Moonbug Kids.)

Original release
- Network: TVO; Knowledge Network; Radio-Canada; Access
- Release: September 6, 2010 – February 25, 2013

Rob the Robot is an animated preschool television series based on the children's book series of the same name by John Magart, that originally aired on TVO, Knowledge Network, Ici Radio-Canada Télé, and Access from September 6, 2010, to February 25, 2013. It also aired on Australia's Seven Network and ABC Me in Brisbane (BTQ-7 Brisbane), and is currently on America's Vme Kids. The series is a co-production between Amberwood Entertainment and Singapore's One Animation and was commissioned by Canada's TVO, British Columbia's Knowledge Network, CBC's Radio Canada Television, and Access. 104 episodes were produced.

== Plot ==
The series revolves around four young friends flying around the Robot Galaxy in a spaceship to different planets to solve various tasks.

== Characters ==
The main characters are:

- Rob (voiced by Stacey DePass) is the titular character, a curious and adventurous light silver metal robot.
- Ema (voiced by Jordi Mand) is a cute and smart linguist who is the only alien of the group. She is green with a pink suit.
- TK (voiced by Camden Angelis) is a red kind and cheerful robot with a passion for building and repairing. Her name is initialized as "Tool Kit".
- Orbit (voiced by Jake Beale) is a clumsy orange robot with a cylindrical head and two bandages taped to the back of his head who works as an artist.
- Mission Control (voiced by John Stocker) is a robotic hand in charge of the spaceship who helps Rob and his friends with solving problems and going on missions.
- Squeak is a blue clockwork mouse with a great sense of smell who seldom tags along in the adventures.
