= Richard Boddington =

British-Canadian film director

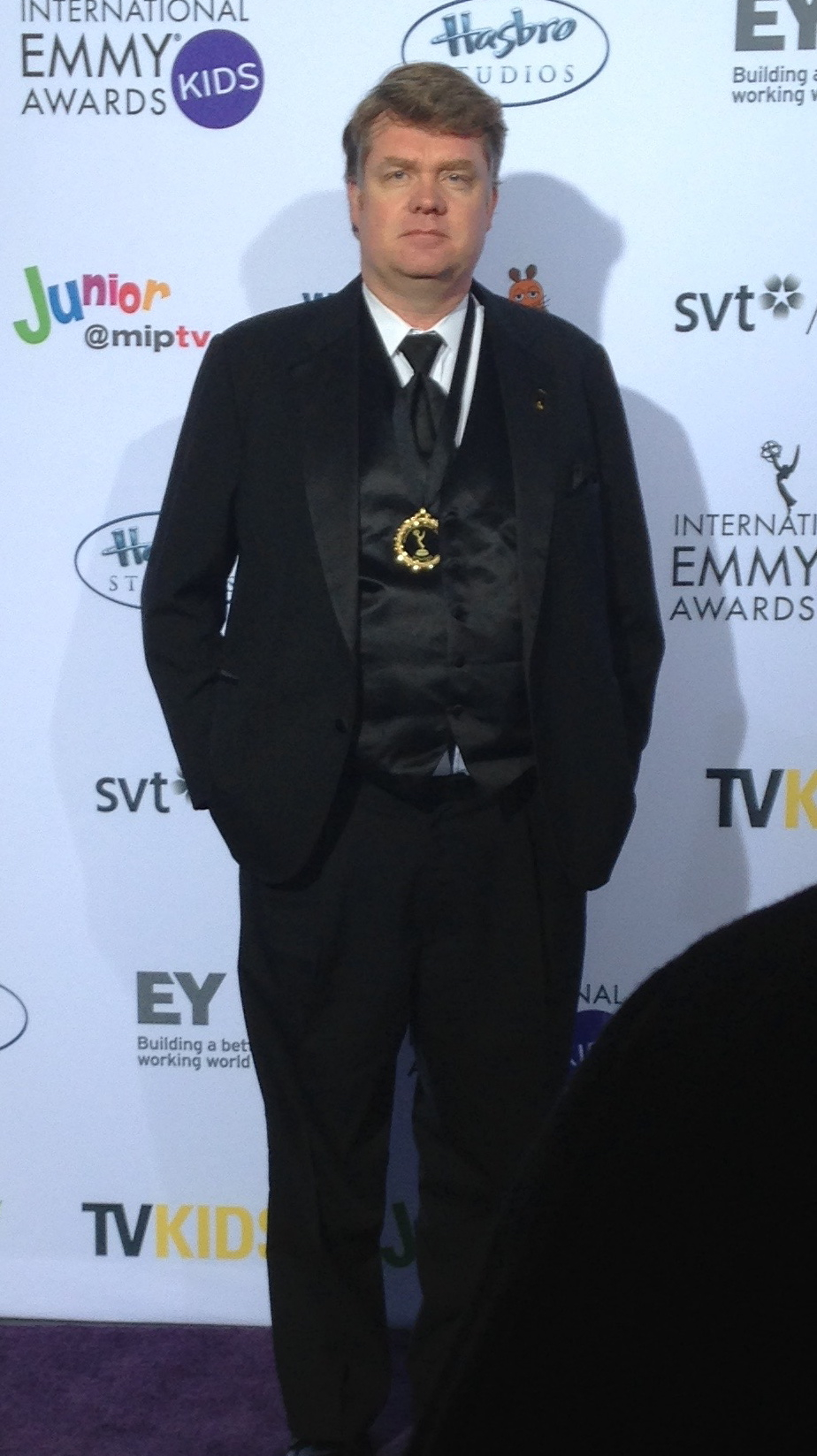
- Boddington at the iEmmys, New York, New York, 2015
- Born: February 6, 1968 (age 58); Yorkshire, England
- Occupations: Film director; Film Writer; Film Editor; Cinematographer; Television producer
- Years active: 1995 - Present

Richard Boddington (born February 6, 1968) is a British-Canadian film director, writer, editor, cinematographer and television producer, with dual citizenship from the United Kingdom and Canada. Born in Yorkshire, England, he now resides in Ontario, Canada.

== Career ==
Richard began making films at the age of 12 using Super 8. After seeing E.T. in 1982, he committed to being a filmmaker. He kept making Super 8 films in high school, and attended film school in the United States. From 1995–2000, Boddington worked as a Producer at the CTV Network in Toronto.

His first film was the self-financed Dark Reprieve (2008), for which he was the producer, director, editor and director of photography. He then directed, produced, and edited the family comedy film The Dogfather (2010), which starred Chris Parnell.

In 2012, Boddington wrote, directed, edited and produced his third feature film, Against the Wild (2014), which was shot entirely on location in Northern Ontario. The film tells the story of two children and their Alaskan Malamute, who must fight for survival after their plane crashes in the wilderness. Featuring a number of animals, a Boddington chose to exclusively use real animals and no computer-generated ones. The film achieved worldwide distribution and won the Director's Choice Grand Prize at the 2013 Rhode Island International Film Festival. The film stars Natasha Henstridge, CJ Adams, and Erin Pitt.

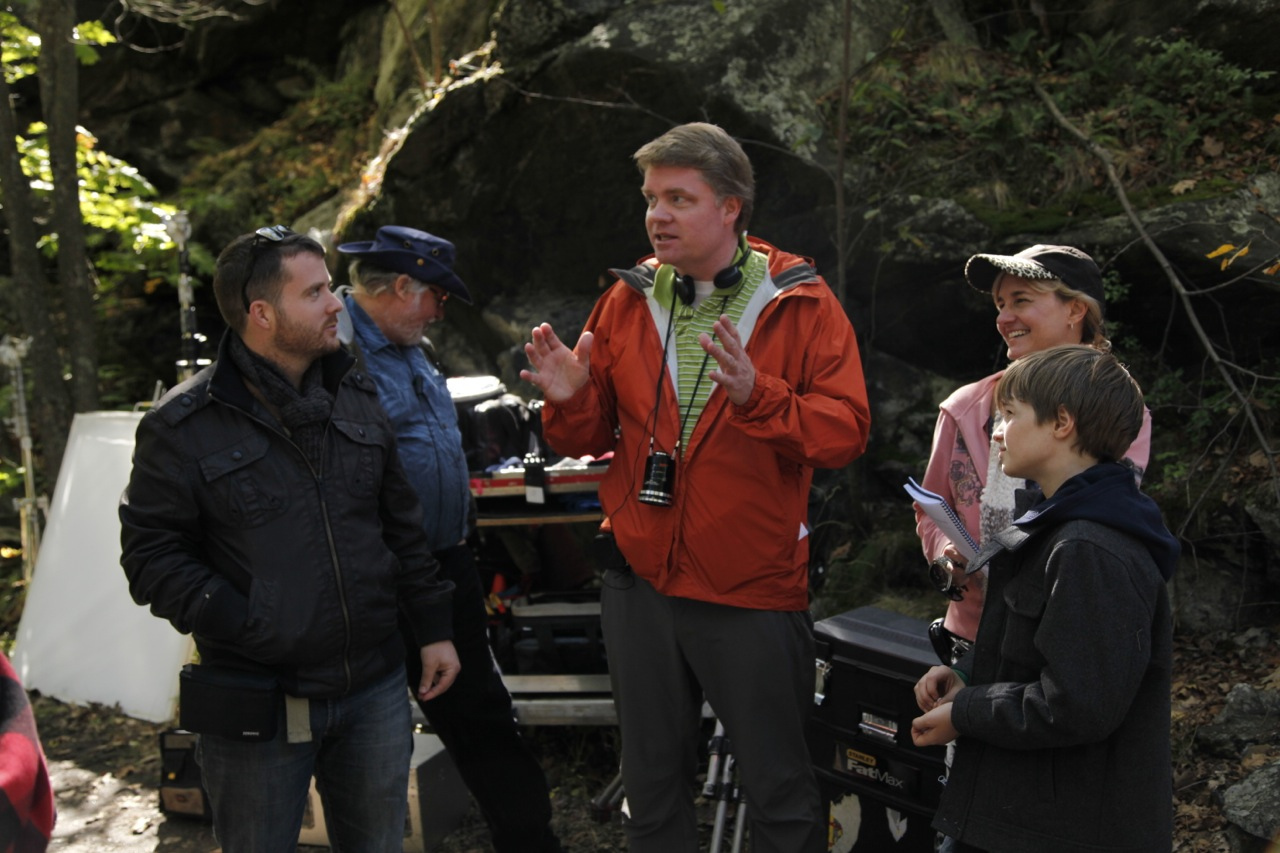
Boddington (center) directing Against the Wild.

Against the Wild was nominated for the best Kids TV Movie/Mini-Series for the International Emmy Kids Awards in October 2014.

In May 2015, Boddington filmed Against the Wild 2: Survive the Serengeti in South Africa. The film is a sequel to Against the Wild and follows the Alaskan Malamute, Chinook, on another adventure. This time Chinook must protect two children after their plane crashes in the African bush. The film features extensive use of elephants, lions, giraffes, hyenas and leopards. The film stars Jeri Ryan, John Paul Ruttan and Ella Ballentine. It was released into U.S. theatres on February 26, 2016. The film was acquired by several international distributors across Europe and North America, and has subsequently aired on television channels including TF1 in France, STARZ in the USA, Antenna 3 in Spain, and Channel 5 in the UK.

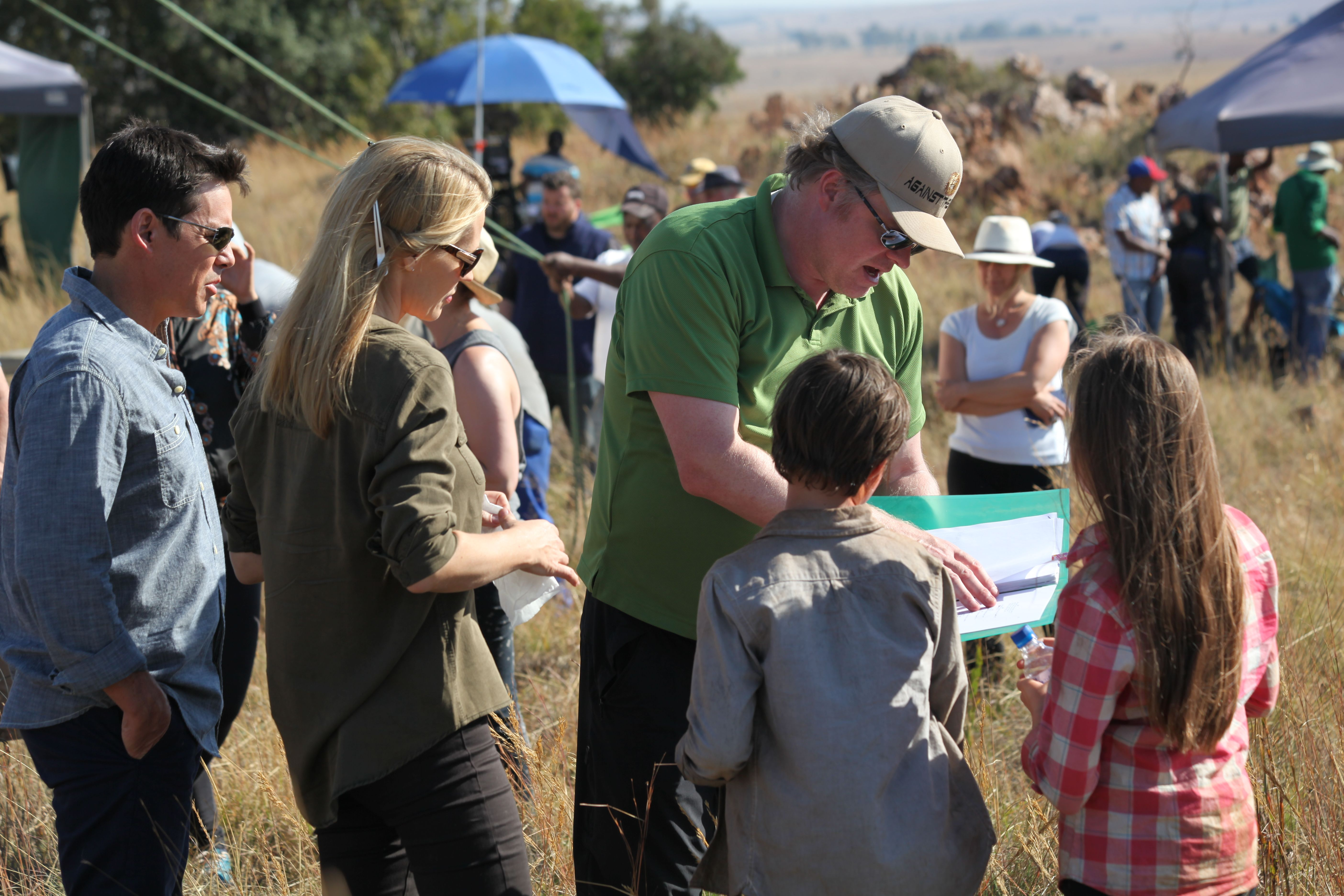
Richard Boddington directing the cast of Against The Wild 2 in South Africa, May 2015.

In April 2017, Boddington began production in South Africa on Phoenix Wilder and the Great Elephant Adventure, which starred Elizabeth Hurley and Sam Ashe Arnold. Boddington was heavily inspired by The Black Stallion (film), a movie he considers to be a masterpiece. The movie tells the story of an orphan boy (Phoenix) who is adopted by his aunt and moves to join her in Africa. While on safari, Phoenix becomes lost in the African bush and befriends an elephant that helps him stop the efforts of elephant poachers. The film had its world premiere at the Durban International Film Festival in July 2017, and was recognized by the Canadian government as a film that highlights the success of the Canada/South Africa co-pro treaty for film signed in 1997. It opened in 725 theatres in the USA on April 16, 2018. The movie was released on DVD and VOD in the USA by Lionsgate on October 23, 2018, and renamed An Elephant's Journey for the U.S. market. Richard Boddington spoke about his experiences making the film with the International Elephant Foundation. On his decision to use real elephants in the film, he said: "Using a real animal is key to making these films, one could use computer generated animals that is true. However, you’ll never be able to program into a computer the unpredictability of a living organism."

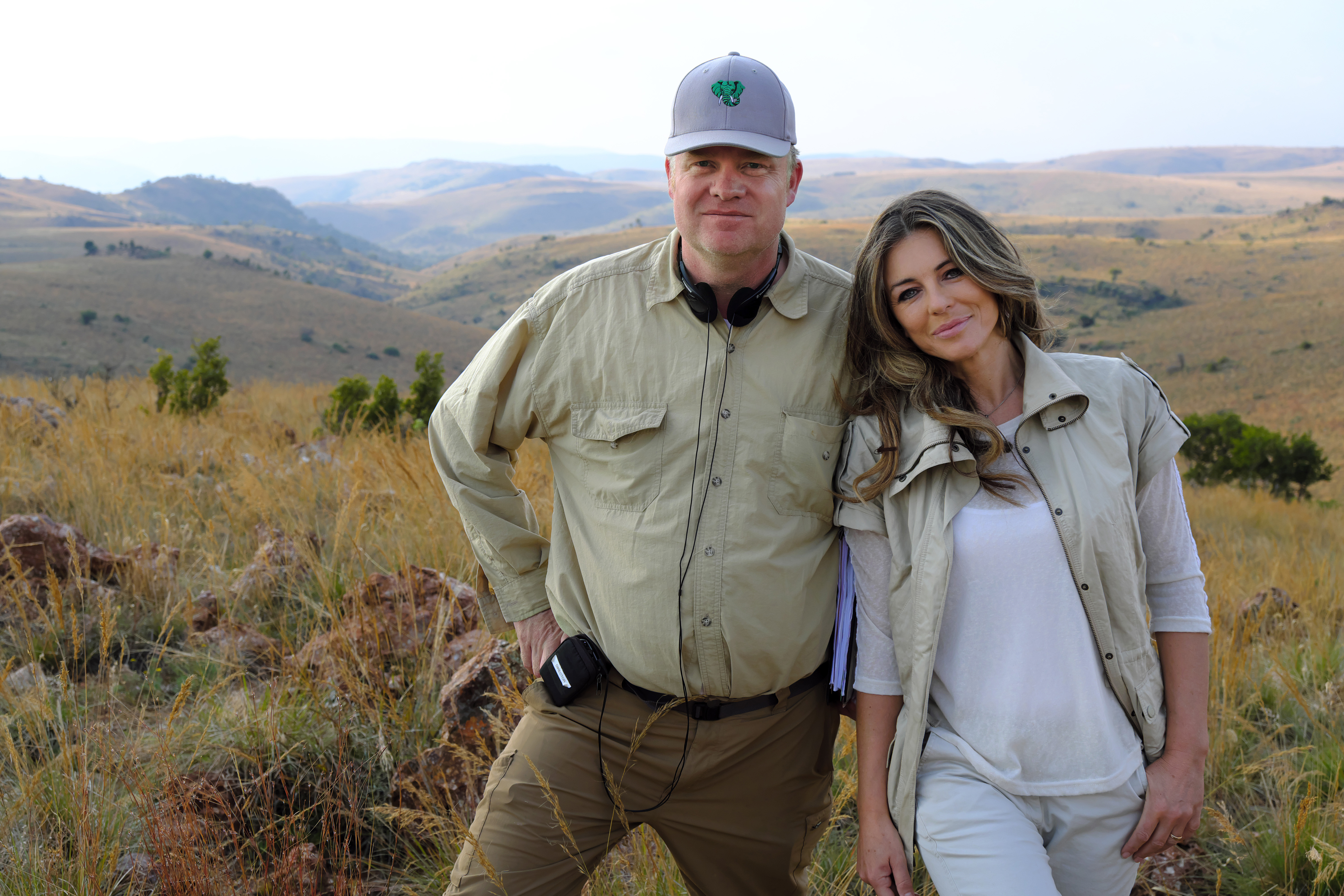
Richard Boddington and Elizabeth Hurley on set in South Africa

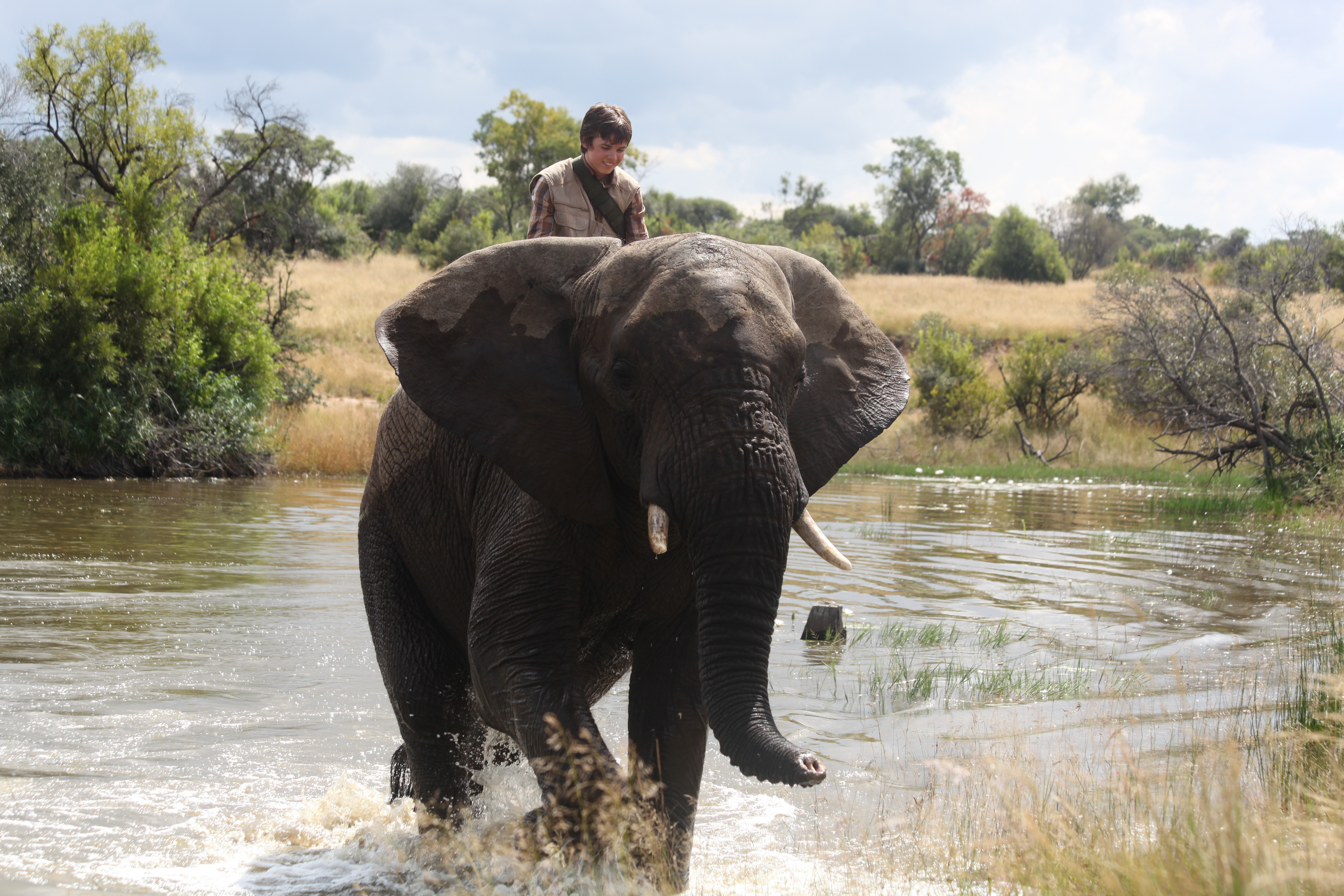
Sam Ashe Arnold and Chova

In a 2018 op-ed for Fox News, Boddington stated "The Great Elephant Census reported that between 2007 and 2014, Africa lost 144,000 elephants. . . Knowing that the elephant has the longest gestational period of any animal at 22 months, just think about how long it would take to replace 144,000 elephants with such a low reproductive rate!"

In October 2019, Boddington began work on the third in his series of Against the Wild films, entitled Against The Wild III: The Journey Home. This time Chinook, the Alaskan Malamute, must lead a shipwrecked blind man out of the wilderness, while his children launch a rescue mission of their own to find him. Natasha Henstridge reprises her role from the first film, and stars as the aunt of the children. The film also stars Morgan Dipietrantonio, Zackary Arthur, Steve Byers, and Colin Fox. The film was distributed by Lionsgate in the U.S. market as Hero Dog: The Journey Home. The film attained the 9th place ranking in Redbox movie rentals in the USA in its first week after release.

On January 12, 2021, three of Boddington's films were shown on the new HBO Max platform in the USA. Against the Wild, Against The Wild II: Survive the Serengeti, and Phoenix Wilder and the Great Elephant Adventure, a.k.a., An Elephant's Journey.

In September 2021, Boddington began filming Wickensburg, his seventh career feature film. The film tells the story of a recently widowed mother, played by Denise Richards, and her 13 year old son, Elliott, played by Jensen Gering. The pair move to the small town of Wickensburg so that Richards' character can take a new job, while Elliott discovers that the town is under a curse from an evil warlock. The film additionally stars Julian Richings, Maurice Dean Wint, and Steve Byers.

In the summer of 2023, Boddington began production on Return To Wickensburg, a sequel to Wickensburg. This film sees the return of the original cast, Denise Richards, Julian Richings, Jensen Gering, Catherine White, and Steve Byers. In the sequel, Mr. Hexenmeister has escaped from prison and plans to destroy Wickensburg by blowing up the dam and flooding the town.

In 2024, Boddington completed two new feature films, Secrets of Wickensburg, the third instalment in the Wickensburg franchise, and LA Jesus. LA Jesus tells the story of a troubled executive, Bradley Stryker who meets a homeless man on Venice Beach who claims to be Jesus Christ. Both films are set for a 2025 release. LA Jesus was the recipient of numerous film festival awards, and was praised by critics. Alan NG at Film Threat wrote, "The star of the film is Richard Boddington’s script." Mark Lakatos at Take 2 Indie Review, said, "LA Jesus is a delight in more ways than one. Well-acted and smartly written, it’s a topical dramedy that’s worth your time."

== Filmography ==
Year	Title	As	Notes
2008	Dark Reprieve	Cinematographer, Editor, Producer, Director	
2010	The Dogfather	Editor, Producer, Director	
2013	Against the Wild	Writer, Editor, Producer and Director	Winner - RIIFF Director's Choice Award, Rhode Island International Film Festival Nominated - Best Kids TV Movie/Mini-Series, International Emmy Kids Awards
2016	Against the Wild 2: Survive the Serengeti	Writer, Editor, Producer, Director	
2017	Phoenix Wilder and the Great Elephant Adventure	Writer, Editor, Producer, Director	
2021	Hero Dog: The Journey Home	Writer, Editor, Producer, Director	
2022	Wickensburg	Writer, Editor, Producer, Director	
2024	Return to Wickensburg	Writer, Editor, Producer, Director	
2025	Secrets of Wickensburg	Writer, Editor, Producer, Director	Winner - Best Family/Children Film, The World Film Festival in Cannes
2025	LA Jesus	Writer, Editor, Producer and Director	Winner - Best Director, New York City International Film Festival (2025) Winner - Best Narrative Feature Film, World Film Festival in Cannes (2025) Winner - Best Narrative Feature Film, Los Angeles Film Awards (2025) Winner - Best Foreign Film, The Santa Clarita International Film Festival (2025) Winner - Best Director, Richard Boddington, New York International Film Awards (2025) Winner - Work of Excellence Award, Buenos Aires International Film Festival (2026) Winner - Best Original Screenplay, Richard Boddington Writer, The Indie Vegas Film Festival (2026)
