= Jake Beale =

Canadian actor (born 2001)

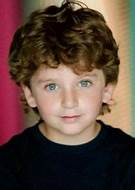
- Beale as a child
- Born: October 17, 2001 (age 24); Toronto, Ontario, Canada
- Occupation: Actor
- Years active: 2005–2016

Jake Beale (born October 17, 2001) is a Canadian former child actor. His roles include Mike the Knight (2011–2017), Rob the Robot (2010–2013), Daniel Tiger's Neighborhood (2012–2016), Arthur (2012–2013) and A Dennis the Menace Christmas (2007). He began acting at the age of four.

== Filmography ==
Year	Title	Role	Notes
2007	More of Me	Boone McGowan	TV movie
2009	The Ron James Show	Nick	TV series
2010	Doodlebops Rockin' Road Show	Daniel	TV series
2010	Ninety-one	Young Cate's Brother	Short
2010–2011	Baxter	Dennis McNab	TV series
2010–2013	Rob the Robot	Orbit	TV series
2011	The Kennedys	Kennedy Kid #2	TV mini series
2011	Super Why!	Charlie the Bear	TV series Episode "Bedtime for Bear"
2011–2012	Mike the Knight	Mike	TV series
2012–2013	Arthur	D.W. Read	TV series
2012–2016	Daniel Tiger's Neighborhood	Daniel Tiger	TV series
