= Mike the Knight =

- Genre: Animated; Action; Children's; Fantasy; Educational; Preschool
- Created by: Alexander Bar
- Directed by: Neil Affleck (season 1); Charles E. Bastien (seasons 2-3)
- Voices of: Jake Beale; Trek Buccino; Erin Pitt; Martin Roach; Andrew Sabiston; Alyson Court
- Theme music composer: David Schweitzer
- Opening theme: "Mike the Knight" performed by Richard Oliver
- Countries of origin: United Kingdom; Canada
- Original language: English
- No. of seasons: 3
- No. of episodes: 75 (128 segments)

Production
- Running time: 24 minutes
- Production companies: Nelvana; HIT Entertainment (Note: As HIT (MTK) Limited)

Original release
- Network: Treehouse TV (Canada); CBeebies (UK); Nick Jr. (US)
- Release: September 8, 2011 – January 13, 2017

Mike the Knight is a CGI-animated children's television series created by Alexander Bar and written by Marc Seal. The series premiered on Treehouse TV in Canada on September 8, 2011, and aired until January 13, 2017.

== Premise ==
The series stars Mike, a knight-in-training who aspires to be a knight like his father, the King, who is away exploring other lands. He goes on adventures with his dragon friends, Sparkie and Squirt, his sister Evie, who is a witch-in-training, and his horse, Galahad, through which he learns from his mistakes and learns how to be a proper knight.

== Characters ==
- Mike is an eight-year-old knight-in-training who aspires to be a knight like his father. He is voiced by Jake Beale, later Trek Buccino, in North America and Benjamin Baker in the United Kingdom.
- Galahad is Mike's horse.
- Evie is Mike's younger sister: a wizard-in-training who joins him on missions whenever she can. However, her magic often goes awry. She is voiced by Erin Pitt in North America and Jessica Hann in the United Kingdom.
- Mr. Cuddles is Evie's pet frog and best friend.
- Sparkie is a large, red fire-breathing dragon. He is voiced by Martin Roach in North America and Colin McFarlane in the United Kingdom.
- Squirt is a small, blue water-squirting dragon. He is voiced by Andrew Sabiston in North America and Russell Tovey in the United Kingdom.
- Flutter is Squirt's younger sister, who is also a water-squirting dragon. She does not appear much, and when she does she is usually with her parents.
- Queen Martha is Mike and Evie's mother and the King's wife, who is wise and kind. She is voiced by Alyson Court in North America and Beth Chalmers in the United Kingdom.
- The King is Martha's husband and Mike and Evie's father. He is absent in earlier episodes due to being on adventures, but appears in multiple episodes in the third season.
- Yip and Yap are Queen Martha's corgis. Yip is male and wears a blue collar and Yap is female and wears a red collar. They often get into trouble, usually because of Mike's knightly interests or Evie's magic. They are voiced by Robert Tinkler in both versions.
- Fernando is a bard whose ditties begin and end each episode. He is voiced by Scott McCord in North America and Russell Tovey in the United Kingdom.
- Trollee is a troll who is one of Mike's friends and can be shy. He is voiced by Nissae Isen in North America and Samantha Reynolds in the United Kingdom.
- Mr. Troll and Mrs. Troll are Trollee's parents.
- Richard and his younger brother Peter are companions.
- Edward is a knight-in-training from a different kingdom and Mike's rival.
- Robin & Marian are young children who sometimes help out.
- The Great Walforfini is an elderly wizard who sometimes teaches Evie.
- Mrs. Piecrust is a baker who produces pies and who Mike often rescues. She is voiced by Sarah Carbanoose.
- Mr. Blacksmith is the town blacksmith, who has a son.

== Episodes ==
Nº	Episode Title
Season 1
1	Mike the Knight and the Smiley Treasure
2	Mike the Knight and the Scary Dragons
3	Mike the Knight and Evie's Birthday Present
4	Mike the Knight and the Galahad The Great
5	Mike the Knight and the Fluttering Favour
6	Mike the Knight and the Tricky Trail
7	Mike the Knight and the Buried Treasure
8	Mike the Knight and the Sir Trollee
9	Mike the Knight in the Mission Mess
10	Mike the Knight and the Trollee In Trouble
11	Mike the Knight and the Scary Noise
12	Mike the Knight and the Mighty Shield
13	Mike the Knight and Peace and Quiet
14	Mike the Knight and the Glendragon News
15	Mike the Knight and the Great Gallop
16	Mike the Knight and the Special Signal
17	Mike the Knight and the Invisible Monster
18	Mike the Knight and the Dragon Squire
19	Mike the Knight and the Knight Hider
20	Mike the Knight and the Trollee's Sleepover
21	Mike the Knight and the Mission Home
22	Mike the Knight and the Many Knights
23	Mike the Knight and Squirt's Story
24	Mike the Knight and the Real Swords
25	Mike the Knight and the Snow Dragon
26	Mike the Knight and Santa's Little Helper
27	Mike the Knight and the Big Swap
28	Mike the Knight and the Triple Trophy Triumph
29	Mike the Knight and the Big Parade
30	Mike the Knight and the Sparkie's Amazing Thing
31	Mike the Knight and the Knightly Campout
32	Mike the Knight and the Wild Boar
33	Mike the Knight and the Great Rescue
34	Mike the Knight and the Monster
35	Mike the Knight and the Troll Treat Pie
36	Mike the Knight and the Wizard's Treasure
37	Mike the Knight and the Sir Super
38	Mike the Knight and the New Castle
39	Mike the Knight and the Polka Dot Horse
40	Mike the Knight and the Viking Snow Day
41	Mike the Knight and the Greatest Story Ever
42	Mike the Knight and the Most Medals
43	Mike the Knight and the Busiest Day
44	Mike the Knight and the Real Dragon
45	Mike the Knight and the Lost Pots
46	Mike the Knight and the Magic Pot
47	Mike the Knight and the Jewel of Glendragon
48	Mike the Knight and the Favour for Trollee
49	Mike the Knight and the Great Protector
50	Mike the Knight and the Sneezing Reindeer
51	Mike the Knight and the Flying Corgis
52	Mike the Knight and the Knightly Welcome
Season 2
1	Mike the Knight and the Night Time Lookout
2	Mike the Knight and the Evie's New Friend
3	Mike the Knight and the Missing Snowman
4	Mike the Knight and the Super Trebuchet
5	Mike the Knight and the Glendragon Big Band
6	Mike the Knight and the Bird Training
7	Mike the Knight and the Broken Shield
8	Mike the Knight and the Evie's Help
9	Mike the Knight and Trollee the Apprentice
10	Mike the Knight and the Fooling Day
11	Mike the Knight and the Safest Kingdom
12	Mike the Knight and the King's Play
13	Mike the Knight and the Present for Trollee
14	Mike the Knight and the Undragonly Dogs
15	Mike the Knight and Evie the Knight
16	Mike the Knight and the Glendragon Fun Run
17	Mike the Knight and the Brave Song
18	Mike the Knight and the Glendragon Big Picture
19	Mike the Knight and the Knightly Net
20	Mike the Knight and the Big Fix
21	Mike the Knight and the Fireless Dragon
22	Mike the Knight and the Knight for a Day
23	Mike the Knight and the Hidden Garden
24	Mike the Knight and the Knightly Training Tricks
25 26	Mike the Knight and the Christmas Castle
27	Mike the Knight and Gargoyle
28	Mike the Knight and the Wooden Horse
29	Mike the Knight and the Knightly Play
30	Mike the Knight and the Tour of the Castle
31	Mike the Knight and the Mr. Cuddles' Bath Time
32	Mike the Knight and the Court Jester
33	Mike the Knight and the Great Waldorfini
34	Mike the Knight and the Special Knightly Things
35	Mike the Knight and the Troll Trail Adventure
36	Mike the Knight and the Snoring Dragon
37	Mike the Knight and the Evie's Magical Mistake
38	Mike the Knight and the Three Missions
39	Mike the Knight and the Super Troll Ball
40	Mike the Knight and the Best Lookout
41	Mike the Knight and the Knight School
42	Mike the Knight and the Galahad's Birthday
43	Mike the Knight and Squirt Sticking to the Plan
44	Mike the Knight and the Stolen Staff
45	Mike the Knight and the Evie's Pet Puppies
46	Mike the Knight and the Magical Flower
47	Mike the Knight and the Size Spell
48	Mike the Knight and Fernando's Mission
49	Mike the Knight and the Hidden Garden Games
50	Mike the Knight and Triple Trouble
51	Mike the Knight and the Bedtime Story
52	Mike the Knight and the Big Book of Training
Special Episodes
SP1	Mike the Knight and the Journey to the Dragon Mountain
SP2	Mike the Knight - Mike's Bravest Mission
Season 3
1	Mike the Knight and the Great Tug of War
2	Mike the Knight and Sparkie's Icy Tail
3	Mike the Knight and the Marvelous Machine
4	Mike the Knight and the Father's Day Gift
5	Mike the Knight and the Super-fast Sleigh Ride
6	Mike the Knight and the Night Time Flight
7	Mike the Knight and the King's Banquet
8	Mike the Knight and the Super Trike
9	Mike the Knight and the Great Exploration
10	Mike the Knight and the Evie's Froggy Day
11	Mike the Knight and Evie and Sir Gargoyle
12	Mike the Knight and the Fire Bird
13	Mike the Knight and the Viking Alarm
14	Mike the Knight and the Bad Weather Box
15	Mike the Knight and Evie and the Runaway Scooter
16	Mike the Knight and the Golden Arrow
17	Mike the Knight and Evie and the Missing Queen
18	Mike the Knight and the Stolen Flag
19	Mike the Knight and the Triple Twist
20	Mike the Knight and the Beast of Glendragon
21	Mike the Knight and the Great Wizard Comet
22	Mike the Knight and Evie and the Magical Challenge
23	Mike the Knight and Evie's Rescue Spells
24	Mike the Knight and the Magical Wish Tree
25 26	Mike the Knight and the Christmas Star

== Broadcast ==
The series premiered on Treehouse TV in Canada on September 6, 2011, and CBeebies in the United Kingdom on November 29, 2011. The first Canadian season consisted of 26 episodes, each 30 minutes long with two fifteen-minute segments. The first British series had 53 segments while the second had 52.

It still airs on those channels, as well as on Tiny Pop in the United Kingdom, Discovery Kids in Latin America, TF1 in France, ABC Kids in Australia, NPO Zappelin in the Netherlands, and TV2 in New Zealand.

In the United States, it aired on Nick Jr. from March 1, 2012 to November 30, 2018 and on Qubo from December 30, 2019 to December 4, 2020. It also aired in other languages, including in Arabic on Spacetoon and in Welsh under the name 'Meic y Marchog' on S4C.
