= Erin Pitt =

Canadian actress (born 1999)

- Born: Erin Michelle Pitt; September 22, 1999 (age 26); Hamilton, Ontario, Canada
- Occupation: Actress
- Years active: 2010–present

Erin Michelle Pitt (born September 22, 1999) is a Canadian actress, known for her trio of roles in the horror film Silent Hill: Revelation, where she played Dark Alessa, Alessa Gillespie, and the younger Sharon DaSilva. Pitt's first leading role was in the 2013 film Against the Wild as Hanna Wade. She also played the title role in the 2014 made-for-television film An American Girl: Isabelle Dances Into the Spotlight. Pitt is a voice actress and is known for her roles in the television series The 99 as Samda the Invulnerable and Evie in the television series Mike the Knight.

== Life and career ==
Pitt was born in Hamilton, Ontario, one of six siblings. She has two sisters and three brothers. She has attended the Hamilton Academy of Performing Arts, where she studies acting, singing and dancing, and has performed with the Hamilton City Ballet.

Pitt first acted in a Paperoni toy commercial in 2008. In 2010 she has a role in the short film Rick Mercer — Canadian Action Plan. The same year she was cast in the film You Lucky Dog as the character Erin. Following this she acted in the film Camp Rock 2: The Final Jam as Junior Rocker Audrey.

Her first major film was 2012's Silent Hill: Revelation, in which she played the triple roles of Alessa Gillespie, Dark Alessa, and the younger Sharon DaSilva. Pitt appeared on the cover of Fangoria magazine that year as Dark Alessa. She then had the major starring role Hannah Wade in Against the Wild, released in 2014.

In 2014 Pitt starred as Isabelle in the Universal Picture direct-to-DVD production An American Girl: Isabelle Dances Into the Spotlight. She also had the voice role of Evie in the animated series Mike the Knight.

== Filmography ==
Year	Film	Role	Notes
2010	Rick Mercer - Canadian Action Plan	Erin	Short film
2010	You Lucky Dog	Erin	Television film
2010	Camp Rock 2: The Final Jam	Junior Rocker Audrey	Television film
2011	Dan for Mayor	Kaylee	Episode: "Claire 2.0"
2011	Mike the Knight	Evie	Voice role (U.S. version); 12 episodes
2011	Flashpoint	Isabella	Episode: "Grounded"
2012	The Listener	Lisa	Episode: "Lockdown"
2012	Silent Hill: Revelation	Young Sharon DaSilva / Alessa Gillespie / Dark Alessa	Film and Trio Roles
2012	The 99	Samda the Invulnerable	Voice role; 26 episodes
2012	Dear Scavengers	Jemma	Short film
2013	Against the Wild	Hannah Wade	Straight-to-video film
2014	An American Girl: Isabelle Dances Into the Spotlight	Isabelle Palmer	Straight-to-video film
2015	Hello, It's Me	Ella	Television film
2020	Tiny Pretty Things	Laura	2 episodes
2023	Five Second Rule	Isabella Young	Short film
202?	World Without End	Skylar Watkins	Television film
202?	Toast	Ida	Short film

== Awards and nominations ==
Year	Award	Category	Role	Result	Ref.
2013	Rhode Island International Film Festival	Young Artist Award	Against the Wild	Won	
