= Phoenix Wilder and the Great Elephant Adventure =

- Theatrical release poster
- Directed by: Richard Boddington
- Written by: Richard Boddington
- Produced by: Richard Boddington; Greig Buckle; Jesse D. Ikeman
- Starring: Elizabeth Hurley; Sam Ashe Arnold; Tertius Meintjes; Hlomla Dandala; Louis Minnaar
- Cinematography: Stephen Chandler Whitehead
- Edited by: Richard Boddington
- Music by: Andries Smit
- Distributed by: Daro Film Distribution (international); Lionsgate Home Entertainment (U.S)
- Release dates: July 15, 2017 (Durban); April 16, 2018
- Running time: 87 minutes
- Countries: Canada; South Africa
- Language: English

Phoenix Wilder and the Great Elephant Adventure is a 2017 Canadian, South African adventure film, written and directed by Richard Boddington the film stars Elizabeth Hurley, Hlomla Dandala, Sam Ashe Arnold and Tertius Meintjes.

== Plot ==
Phoenix Wilder, a 13-year-old boy living in foster care in Texas after the deaths of his parents, is sent to live with his aunt Sarah and uncle Jack at their wildlife reserve in Tanzania. While adjusting to his new surroundings in the Serengeti, Phoenix becomes separated from a safari group and is stranded in the African wilderness.

While attempting to survive, Phoenix frees a bull elephant caught in a poacher's snare and names him Indlovu. The elephant protects Phoenix from wildlife, and the two develop a close bond as Phoenix searches for a way home.

Phoenix soon discovers evidence of elephant poaching and learns that organized hunters are operating throughout the region. After witnessing captured elephants and ivory trafficking, he becomes determined to help Indlovu protect the herd. Their actions disrupt several poaching operations, drawing the attention of the group's leader, Blake Von Stein, who orders his men to capture both Phoenix and the elephant.

After Phoenix is captured, he discovers evidence linking Uncle Jack to the poachers, leading him to question whom he can trust. Indlovu rescues Phoenix, and together they return to confront the poachers while wildlife ranger Colonel Ibori and his team close in on the camp. During the confrontation, Phoenix frees the captive elephants, and Indlovu helps defeat the poachers.

In the final confrontation, Von Stein attempts to kill Phoenix and Indlovu but is stopped by Uncle Jack before Colonel Ibori arrives to arrest the poachers. With the elephant herd reunited and the poaching operation dismantled, Phoenix bids farewell to Indlovu as the elephants return to the wilderness.

== Cast ==
- Elizabeth Hurley as Aunt Sarah
- Sam Ashe Arnold as Phoenix Wilder
- Tertius Meintjes as Uncle Jack
- Hlomla Dandala as Col. Ibori
- Louis Minnaar as Blake Von Stein, a notorious elephant poacher

== Filming ==
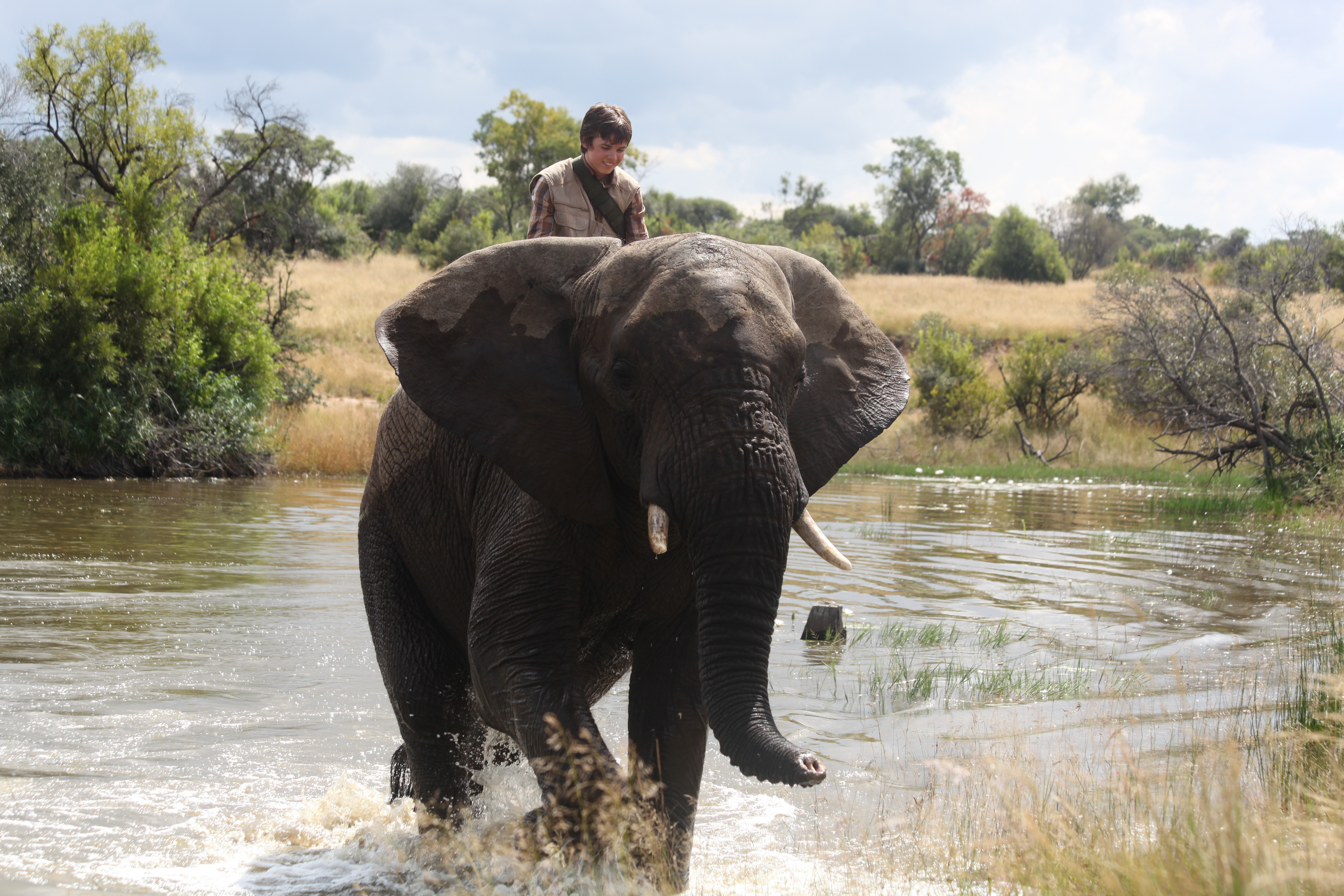
Sam Ashe Arnold and Chova

Principal photography took place in South Africa at a wildlife reserve during the month of May in 2017. Boddington had the entire cast and crew stay in a remote location, so that no elephants would need to be transported for the production.

== Release ==
The film premiered at the 2017 Durban International Film Festival and later opened to 725 U.S. screens on April 16, 2018. On October 23, 2018, the film was released in the USA on DVD, Digital, and On-Demand by Lionsgate under the title, An Elephant's Journey.
