= Against the Wild =

- A promotional poster for the film
- Directed by: Richard Boddington
- Written by: Richard Boddington
- Produced by: Richard Boddington
- Starring: CJ Adams; Erin Pitt; Ted Whittall; John Tench; Natasha Henstridge
- Cinematography: Stephen Whitehead
- Edited by: Richard Boddington
- Music by: Varhan Orchestrovich Bauer
- Release date: 2013
- Country: Canada
- Language: English

Against the Wild is a 2013 Canadian direct-to-video children's film directed by Richard Boddington and starring CJ Adams, Erin Pitt, Natasha Henstridge and Ted Whittall.

== Plot ==
Zach Wade (13 years old) and Hannah (12 years old) are brother and sister whose parents have separated and are planning a divorce. It's a difficult time for the entire family. However, life is made a little easier for Zach and Hannah because they have their dog, Chinook (an Alaskan Malamute). The three make a great team and enjoy their time together.

Zach, Hannah, and Chinook, fly deep into the wilderness to meet up with their father (Robert) who is the vice president of a mining operation.On the appointed day, the children and their dog are picked up at their dock. After saying goodbye to their mother, they depart by seaplane with the company pilot Charlie Foster.

As the plane heads North deep into the wilderness they suddenly encounter engine trouble and Charlie tells the children to brace themselves for a crash landing. The plane comes in low and begins to smash into the trees before slamming into the ground hard.

Inside the plane the three humans are alive but unconscious from the impact of the crash. Zach examines Charlie, he is alive but moans in a state of semi consciousness. Zach tries the radio, he turns the dials, sparks shoot out, the radio is dead. Zach and Hannah decide that they must try and find help, they gather up any useful object they can find in the plane and set off with Chinook.

Meanwhile, Robert Wade has been notified that the plane is overdue and cannot be reached via radio. The worried Robert informs Susan. Robert begins to co-ordinate a search and rescue effort.

Zach and Hannah trek through the woods, they begin to realize that they are in more trouble than they thought. They discuss going back to the plane to await rescue, and soon discover that they are so lost that returning to the plane is now impossible.

Meanwhile, Robert has taken to the skies in the company helicopter and is conducting a detailed search of the area they believe the plane went down.

The children and Chinook come across a large cave and build a fire by the entrance. The fire slowly dies as Zach and Hannah talk, Chinook is alerted by a strange noise, something is watching the children from inside the cave. Chinook looks into the cave and growls, “what is it boy?” Zach inquires.

Suddenly something charges toward the children, Chinook gets up and barks wildly, Hannah screams in terror as a flock of quail blast past the children, scaring them half to death. Chinook chases the quail into the woods, Zach and Hannah take deep breaths of relief, when Hannah suddenly hears something. The sound of a distant chopper can be heard. The children run into the woods and try to get the helicopters attention with a flashlight. They are not seen and the chopper flies off.

In the morning the children notice a plateau far off in the distance and make it their goal to reach this high spot where they are sure they will be seen.

Meanwhile, Robert and Susan are growing increasingly impatient with the rescue effort. Robert is frustrated with the authorities and Susan is frustrated with her estranged husband. Robert and Susan are told they cannot join the search on foot as they might also become lost. The company helicopter is now out of commission due to oil leaks.

Zach, Hannah, & Chinook, set off again they walk for hours. Finally they reach a fast running river that they need to cross. The children find an old log that has fallen across the river and decide to use it to cross the water. Zach goes across first, then Chinook, as Hannah gets halfway across she slips and falls in the water.

Hannah is swept downstream, Hannah cries out to Zach and Chinook. Finally Chinook dives in and brings Hannah back to shore. Hannah has injured her ankle in the ordeal.

The children camp so that Hannah can rest and dry out. Zach is off collecting firewood with Chinook when three wolves enter the camp. Hannah desperately tries to hold them off with a stick from the fire. Zach and Chinook soon arrive back at the camp. Chinook charges in and confronts a wolf, Zach throws his baseball at the other, and the wolves are driven off.

Hannah is unable to walk on her ankle. Zach builds a travois (sled made from sticks) so that the powerful Chinook can pull her through the woods.

A ground search team finally locates the wreckage. Soon a barely alive Charlie Foster is being taken out of an air ambulance and into the hospital. He tells Zach and Hannah's father that he has no idea were the children went to, when he woke up they were gone. Leaving him only a note.

As the search for the children has progressed, Robert and Susan have grown closer as the ordeal has drawn them together.

Zach and Hannah find a beautiful waterfall with a sparkling stream. Chinook alerts the children to the salmon in the shallows. Zach finally catches one with his bare hands after several attempts. The children enjoy their meal and spend the night.

Zach and Hannah continue to make their way through the woods and come across a nice rest spot where they stop. From the forest comes a curious raccoon who raids Zach's backpack.

Zach and Hannah trudge on. As they come to a high spot, Zach spots smoke rising from the forest. A forest fire is fast approaching them.

The children enter a clearing, Chinook stops, raises his ears, and begins to growl. A grizzly bear bursts from the trees and heads straight for the children and Chinook. Zach and Hannah are frozen with fear. Chinook barks, snaps, and lunges at the bear. The bear stands up on its hind legs and roars. Chinook does not back down, he continues to harass the bear. Zach and Hannah run for their lives finding shelter under a fallen tree. The grizzly does not give up and gives chase. The bear attempts to get at Zach and Hannah through the tree branches. Chinook arrives on the scene and bravely bites the bear's paw, hard. The bear limps off in pain. The children are saved and reunite with Chinook.

Meanwhile, back at the search and rescue camp, Robert has just been informed by the captain that the search has been called off due to the forest fire. A frustrated Robert weighs his options.

The children finally arrive at the plateau and celebrate their achievement. As Hannah and Chinook dance around in joy Zach does not realize how close to the edge he has come and falls over the side.

Hannah yells down to Zach. He's okay, but he has fallen quite a ways and can't get back up. Zach tells Hannah to go and get help but Hannah refuses to leave Zach. Hannah speaks to Chinook, through her tears she tells Chinook he has to find some help. Chinook bounds off into the woods alone.

Robert and Susan commandeer an ATV and begin to search on their own.

Chinook runs fast through the woods, through the clearings, over fallen logs, etc. Chinook is being watched by the three wolves he confronted earlier and they give chase. The wolves catch up to Chinook. Chinook runs hard and jumps across a gorge in a mighty leap. The wolves stop and decide not to follow.

Hannah continues to comfort Zach as he tries to deal with his predicament.

Robert and Susan drive their ATV fast through the woods when Chinook suddenly bursts from the forest in front of them. Susan yells to Robert, “Follow him!” Robert and Susan are led back to Hannah and Zach by Chinook. After a brief reunion Robert engineers the rescue of Zach by using a rope and harness tied to the ATV. Susan drives the ATV, while Hannah relays the instructions from her dad to her mother. The entire family unites to save Zach.

Once safely inside the ATV, Robert and Susan inform Zach and Hannah that the divorce has been called off and that they will all live together as a family once again.

== Reception ==
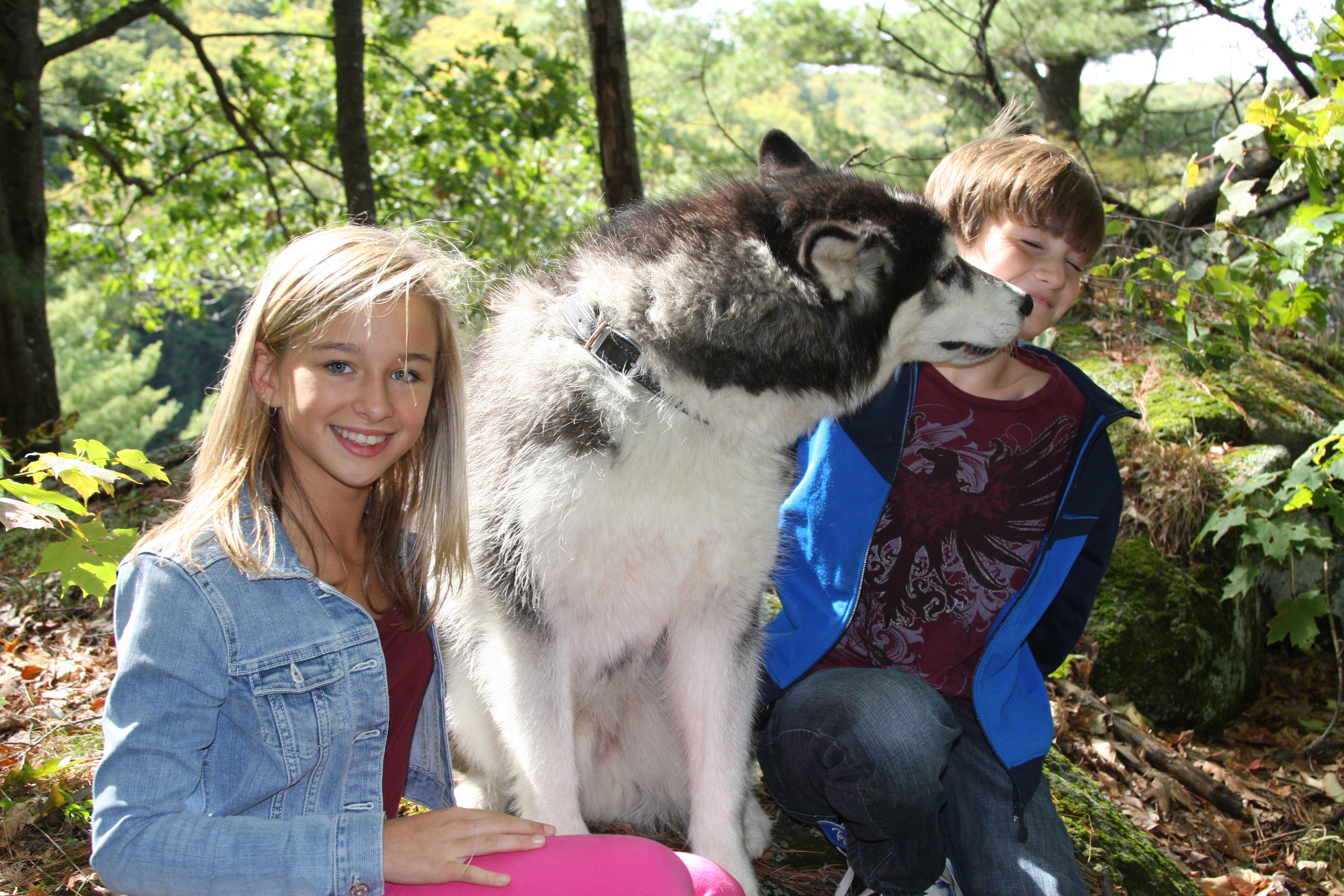
Erin Pitt, Huston, and CJ Adams on a set from the film.

Richard Boddington received the Director's Choice Grand Prize for the film at the 2013 Rhode Island International Film Festival.

Since the film was not released in theaters, being direct-to-video, its financial profits were from DVD sales only which amounted to about $2 million.

Against The Wild was nominated for an International Emmy Award in 2014.

== Sequel ==
Against the Wild 2: Survive the Serengeti was released in American theatres in February 2016, the only Canadian film to be released in the US that year.
