= International Elephant Foundation =

US-based non-profit organization

- Formation: 1999; 27 years ago
- Type: Nonprofit
- Tax ID no.: 75-2815706
- Legal status: 501(c)(3)
- Purpose: Elephant Conservation Charity
- Headquarters: Azle, Texas
- Location: US
- Board President: Michael Fouraker
- Executive Director: Deborah Olson
- Board of directors: Michael Fouraker; Charlie Gray; Tom Schmid; Dr. Kristi Burtis; Tom Albert; Brian Aucone; Lou Barreda; Rob Bernardy; Frank Carlos Camacho; Daryl Hoffman; Gary Johnson; Liz Larsen; Dr. Arne Lawrenz; Amos Morris; Tim Morrow; Tim Thier
- Website: https://elephantconservation.org/

The International Elephant Foundation (IEF) is a non-profit 501(c)(3) corporation. Formed by individuals and institutions, IEF is dedicated to the conservation of African and Asian elephants worldwide.

In 1998, Executive Director of Fort Worth Zoo Michael Fouraker envisioned an elephant foundation to provide funds and expertise to elephant related projects. Michael was a board member of International Rhino Foundation (IRF), and used the organizational structure and business plan of IRF as a template for multiple elephant holding facilities with diverse missions to come together for a shared common goal of contributing to the long-term preservation of elephants.

In November 1998, Michael invited nine representatives from zoos, private elephant facilities, circuses and a university to Fort Worth, Texas, to discuss how a foundation could significantly enhance current conservation efforts. From this first organizational meeting the International Elephant Foundation was born. The IEF was incorporated in 1999.

== Mission ==
The mission of the IEF is to support and operate elephant conservation and education programs both in managed facilities and in the wild, with an emphasis on management, protection and scientific research. The organization is recognized by, among others, the Association of Zoos and Aquariums (AZA), the Morris Animal Foundation and the United States Fish and Wildlife Service (USFWS) as a bona fide conservation organization. Since 1999, IEF has provided support to over 200 elephant conservation projects worldwide and over $8 million in direct financial assistance.

== Projects ==
The International Elephant Foundation provides funding for a number of conservation projects every year both in Africa and Asia. Below are examples of projects that have been or are being funded.

=== African forest elephants ===
- Boots on the Ground-Ziama, Republic of Guinea

The Ziama Biosphere Reserve is the largest classified forest in Guinea and is the home to the only viable forest elephant population in the Republic of Guinea, with approximately 200 individuals who play a vital role in the biodiversity and habitat health of the region. The forest elephant population has declined over the last several decades due to poaching and habitat degradation, forcing elephants into smaller areas and into closer contact with humans which leads to more conflict over space and resources. Game rangers and eco-guards have been better equipped with equipment and supplies so they can undertake multi-day patrols deeper into unprotected regions of the forest to guard this key population of elephants while placing satellite collars on two forest elephants from two established herds is allowing researchers to track the animals’ movements and provide information to establish an early warning system for farmers which will help mitigate human-elephant conflict.

=== African savannah eElephants ===
- Mounted Horse Patrol Anti-Poaching Unit for Mount Kenya, Kenya

The horses and their riders of Mount Kenya Trust are working with the Kenya Wildlife Service to secure the areas of the National Reserve between Meru and Sirimon which have become subject to indiscriminate habitat and wildlife destruction within the high altitude zone of Mount Kenya. This project provides enforcement personnel on horseback to decrease the levels of elephant and bushmeat poaching, monitor wildlife, increase awareness and conservation education within the communities living in and around Mount Kenya, and improve the response times, intelligence gathering and information sharing for the benefit of all of Mount Kenya’s wildlife.

- Big Tusker Project/Large Elephant Monitoring Project, Kenya

Tsavo’s last surviving "hundred pounder" tuskers (elephant bulls bearing ivory weighing over 100 lbs. per side) are in peril as they are especially attractive to poachers. This project individually identifies and monitors the known large bull and cow elephants of Tsavo via light aircraft. Data collected during reconnaissance flights is then shared with Kenya Wildlife Services and Save The Elephants for research and elephant management and protection.

Support for the popular "Sponsor An Elephant" Program goes to support the Big Tuskers, Iconic Cows, and Emerging Tuskers protected by this project.

- Actions to Minimize Illegal Killing of Elephants in Tsavo Conservation Area, Kenya:

The Tsavo ecosystem consisting of the Tsavo East and West and Chyulu Hills National Parks, South Kitui National Reserve, Taita and Galana Ranches (Kenya) and Mukomazi National Park (Tanzania) has about 12,573 elephants and has suffered from poaching. This project will increase the presence of Kenya Wildlife Service (KWS) security personnel through enhanced ground and aerial surveillance and enhanced intelligence information collection, identify sites that require new patrol bases and construct simple housing units at these bases.

- Alleviating Human-elephant conflict in Nkala Game Management Area, Kafue National Park, Zambia:

Human-elephant conflict has escalated in this region and communities have become increasingly disgruntled, which may directly relate to poaching of elephants. To develop new tools to alleviate human-elephant conflict, this project trials experimental fences that use flashing lights to deter elephants from maize crops and investigates options for new cash-crops that elephants find unpalatable.

- Support to Joint Conservancy Anti-poaching Team of Northern Rangelands Trust (NRT) to Protect African Elephants in Northern Kenya:

The ongoing and increasing threat of elephant poaching in the Laikipia-Isiolo-Samburu ecosystem (with the second largest population of elephants in Kenya) is the primary conservation need addressed by this project. The increased effectiveness of the joint anti-poaching team supported by this project has led to significant declines in elephant poaching throughout NRT and reversed the trend which had been steadily increasing throughout 2012. The presence of the joint anti-poaching team has also helped improve the civil and government security response to the theft of livestock and highway banditry as the same people are frequently in all three activities.

- Conservation of Elephants in Southern Murchison Falls Conservation Area, Uganda:

Over fifty years ago Murchison Falls had the most elephants per square kilometer in Africa. After decades of civil war and uncontrolled poaching, a mere 500 elephants remained. Now with peace in Uganda, animal populations can rebound as long as wildlife receive protection against the thousands of snares and leg-hold traps set annually as well as from the gangs of armed poachers. Fourteen land and water-based ranger stations have been constructed and more are being planned. The increased ranger presence is reducing poaching by patrolling park lands, policing the bushmeat and ivory trafficking trade, and removing snares and traps. Marine ranger stations allow rangers to deploy anywhere along the shore to better stop illegal activity. In addition the rangers are being equipped with radios for communication, and geolocation cameras to document patrols to produce evidence for use in the prosecution of poachers and to manage poaching data and trends.

- Serengeti Human Elephant Conflict Mitigation Program:

Poaching and destroying wildlife natural habitats by setting bush fires, cutting down trees for timber, firewood and charcoal has triggered critical human-elephant conflict involving over 30,000 people living in 16 villages that border the Serengeti National Park. This project addresses the root causes of the conflict—poverty and lack of conservation education—through village meetings about conservation and habitat utilization, strategies for repelling the elephants from the village crops, and the acquisition of a grain grinding machine.

- Support to DNPW/CLZ K9 Unit Operations in Lower Zambezi, Zambia:

In response to a surge in wildlife crime and trafficking from 2014-2016, the Department of National Parks and Wildlife and Conservation Lower Zambezi established specialized K9 Unit and Rapid Response Units to help in law enforcement. The four man three dog unit moves between trafficking hotspots in the areas surrounding the national park. Trained for both tracking and detection of illegal wildlife products including ivory, bushmeat, pangolin, rhino horn, rifles, ammunition and various pelts; the dogs have been conducting vehicle searches with their handlers at various checkpoints. This unit contributes to the goal of strangling channels of movement for illegal wildlife products. IEF is supporting the expansion of this unit with additional detection dogs, new equipment for dogs and handlers, new kennel, and refresher training for the current unit.

=== Asian elephants ===
- Conservation Response Units (CRUs) and Elephant Response Units (ERUs) in Sumatra, Indonesia:

IEF support in Sumatra started in the year 2000 when they provided information and veterinary training and supplies with the staff of the elephant training centers on elephant husbandry and health care in an effort to make long-term positive changes in the lives of the captive elephants. In 2004, IEF joined with partners to establish Conservation Response Units (CRUs)/Elephant Response Units(ERUs) to provide protection for plant and animal species through elephant back patrols of wildlife areas. The CRU model utilizes captive elephants, their mahouts, and forest rangers for direct field-based conservation interventions to support the conservation of wild elephants and their habitat and achieve positive outcomes for both elephants and people. The CRU/ERU project: 1) mitigates human-elephant conflict; 2) reduces wildlife crime activities in the important elephant habitat through forest patrol and monitoring; and 3) raises awareness among local people of the importance of conserving elephants and their habitat.

The CRU/ERU model includes units in Way Kambas National Park in south Sumatra. It also include CRU/ERU teams in Tegal Yoso, Margahayu, Bungur, and Brajo Harjosari in northern Sumatra in Aceh province.

- Tongis and Conservation Education for Fringe Villages of Kaziranga National Park, India:

Human-elephant conflict is a major challenge for communities living around Kaziranga National Park, with crop losses causing considerable financial hardship, safety concerns, and even death. To mitigate this conflict and improve crop yields tongis, or lookout points, are built in additional villages to allow farmers to monitor crops safely and avoid confrontation. Interactive community meetings give a conservation educational component to the project.

- Development of Elephant Conservation Response Units, Myanmar:

Based on IEF’s successful Sumatran elephant Conservation Response Unit project, IEF is developing a long-term relationship with Myanma Timber Enterprise (MTE) to assist in developing a Conservation Center and Conservation Response Units that would use out-of-work elephants for eco-education and conservation patrols. This center will also be a base for mahout training and an elephant hospital.

- Plantation of Elephant Food Plants and Natural Barrier Plants, Assam, India:

Human-elephant conflict is a problem in many villages in Assam. In addition to food crops, forests are being logged for their timber, fuel or cleared to make space for cash crop plantations such as rubber. As elephant habitat diminishes, elephants leave the forest and enter human communities in search of food. This project, proposed by affected villagers, will revive the degraded habitat of wild elephants by planting elephant food plants in the existing elephant habitat, and planting natural barriers of thorny plants—Assam lemon and thorny bamboo—between the forest and fields to protect the cultivated areas.

- Building National Consensus for Asian Elephant Conservation in Cambodia:

Habitat loss and degradation is a significant issue for Asian elephant in Cambodia and there has been few targeted conservation efforts. The short-term goals of this project are to collect critical information to enable a monitoring program to be established, to improve human-Asian elephant coexistence and to inform the development of a comprehensive Asian elephant national action plan for Cambodia. The long-term is to develop a monitoring program for Asian elephants in the southern Cardamom Mountains.

- Schools Awareness Program, Sri Lanka:

Human- elephant conflict is a growing problem in Sri Lanka as elephants are forced to leave the forest looking for food and water. These conflicts lead to human and elephant deaths and damage to crops and property. The Schools Awareness Program has presented curriculum at 1,500 schools in the last 10 years and addresses the value of elephants, the causes of conflict, how to minimize the conflicts and stresses the need for conservation.

- Finding Possibilities of Re-opening Elephant Corridors in Northwestern Wildlife Region, Sri Lanka:

This project will seek strategies for reopening elephant corridors in the northwestern wildlife region, identify the locations of existing elephant corridors and isolated elephant habitats, and identify suitable areas for development that will not block the natural migration routes and does not harm the natural food sources of the elephants.

=== Ex situ ===
- EEHV Viral Genomics and Pathogenesis:

The three most common and useful techniques for studying viruses are not applicable for elephant endotheliotropic herpesvirus (EEHV). By using PCR amplification and DNA sequencing directly from clinical samples this project will study the genetic make-up of each virus and the genes and pathways they utilize. The ultimate goal is to identify viral immediate-early genes, latency genes and immune evasion genes that will provide insights into the mechanisms of viral pathogenesis, and will also help for generating engineered attenuated vaccine strains or new targets and approaches for better antiviral drugs.

- Realization of an Effective Vaccine Against Elephant Endotheliotropic Herpesvirus:

EEHV is the single largest cause of death for juvenile Asian elephants in North America and Europe. Furthermore, EEHV-associated deaths have been documented in wild elephants in their natural range countries in both Africa and Asia, adding yet another threat to these endangered species. With IEF support among others, the Ling laboratory in Houston, Texas, has spent the last several years developing the tools needed to discover what parts of the EEHV virus might be useful for developing a vaccine that can induce protective immunity for Asian elephants with the possibility of adapting it for use in African elephants as well.

== Asian Elephant Range States Meeting ==
On April 18–20, 2017, government representatives from Bangladesh, Bhutan, Cambodia, China, India, Indonesia, Laos, Malaysia, Myanmar, Nepal, Sri Lanka, Thailand and Viet Nam met at the Asian Range States Meeting (AERSM) in Jakarta Indonesia. These countries represent the 13 countries who still have extant populations of wild Asian elephants. This meeting was only the second time that all Asian countries with extant populations of wild Asian elephants have met with the first such meeting in 2006 in Kuala Lumpur, Malaysia. The purpose of the AERSM was to improve international collaboration and cooperation in order to protect the endangered species. These nations committed to implementing a "strategic Action Plan for Asian elephants" and codified that vision in "The Jakarta Declaration for Asian Elephant Conservation."

Hosted by the Ministry of Environment and Forestry, Republic of Indonesia, the AERSM was also facilitated by the International Union for Conservation of Nature (IUCN) Species Survival Commission (SSC) Asian Elephant Specialist Group (AsESG). The International Elephant Foundation facilitated this meeting and as well as provided support. Funding was also provided by the Asian Elephant Conservation Fund of the U.S. Fish and Wildlife Service. The European Union (Indonesia Office) and the Regain Foundation, a local Indonesian organization, provided additional support as well.

The AERSM and the resulting Jakarta Declaration for Asian Elephant Conservation has been recognized by conservation organizations and authorities as a benchmark from which to guide future conservation action. The United States Department of Fish and Wildlife Asian Elephant Conservation Fund recognizes these guidelines in "Notice of Funding Opportunity and [Grant] Application Instructions".

== Reception and Critique ==
IEF has board members from all areas of elephant work and management and expertise. This includes zoo directors, veterinarians, private owners, and circuses. In recent years animal rights organizations have tried to target IEF because of their affiliation with those who manage captive elephants. Animal rights organizations have targeted IEF board members, making claims of animal mistreatment in their own businesses, but no court has accepted their claims and attempts at legal action have been dismissed.
