= International Rhino Foundation =

US-based non-profit organization

- Formation: 1989; 37 years ago
- Type: Nonprofit
- Tax ID no.: 75-2395006
- Legal status: 501(c)(3)
- Headquarters: Fort Worth, Texas
- Location: United States
- Board President: John Lukas
- Executive Director: Nina Fascione
- Board of directors: Rick Barongi; Lee Bass; Evan Blumer; Adam Eyres; Michael Fouraker; Lewis Greene; Peter Hall Am; Cameron Kerr; Diane Ledder; John Lukas; Oliver Pagan; Terrie Roth, PhD; April Salter; Mandi Schook; Rick Schwartz
- Key people: Dr. Susie Ellis (Former Executive Director 2006-2020)
- Revenue: ▼US$2,975,613 (2021)
- Website: rhinos.org

The International Rhino Foundation (IRF) is a Texas-based charity focused on the conservation of the five species of rhinoceros which include the White Rhinoceros and Black Rhinoceros of Africa, and the Indian Rhinoceros, Javan Rhinoceros and Sumatran Rhinoceros of Asia.

== History ==
In the late 1980s the population of black rhinos, particularly in Zimbabwe, was dropping at an alarming rate. To help combat the decline, the International Black Rhino Foundation was founded in 1989. The IBRF worked with both in-situ conservation (protecting animals in their native habitat) and ex-situ conservation (protecting animals "off-site" such as in zoos or non-native nature reserves).

The south-central black rhinoceros, which lives in Zimbabwe, South Africa, and Tanzania, had a population of around 9,090 in 1980, but due to a wave of illegal poaching for its horn their numbers decreased to 1,300 in 1995. Due to the efforts of conservation groups like the International Black Rhino Foundation, the population has stabilized, illegal poaching has been reduced, and the population has even been growing. The population of south-central black rhinoceros was around 1,650 in 2001. Nine years later, there are about 4,000 black rhinos in the wild.

In 1993, the IBRF changed its name to the International Rhino Foundation and expanded its focus to all five species of rhinoceros. The International Rhino Foundation helps manage programs in both nature and captivity and also funds research into rhinos. IRF programs in captivity focus on developing ways to help rhinos in the wild.

== Programs ==
The International Rhino Foundation is active in several areas of rhino conservation. It hosts the Web sites for the African Rhino Specialist Group and the Asian Rhino Specialist Group of the Species Survival Commission of the International Union for Conservation of Nature.

=== Sumatran and Javan rhino protection ===
The Critically Endangered Sumatran and Javan rhinoceros may be the most threatened of all land mammals on Earth. Fewer than 100 Sumatran rhinos remain, primarily on Indonesia's Sumatra Island. The population of Javan rhinos numbers only around 65–68 animals. Over the past 10 years, however, losses of Sumatran and Javan rhino have been nearly eliminated in Indonesia through intensive anti-poaching and intelligence activities by IRF-funded Rhino Protection Units. The successes of these units have kept the two species from extinction and are critical for their continued population recovery. Sumatran rhinos are considered extinct in Malaysia, but a tiny population (no more than 10) has recently been found in Kalimantan on the Island of Borneo. Overall, the population of Sumatran rhinos has decreased at a rate of about 50% over the past 15 years, largely from habitat encroachment, deforestation and habitat fragmentation.

In Indonesia, IRF funds Rhino Protection Units (RPUs) which rigorously patrol forests to destroy snares and traps (the main method of poaching for these species) and apprehend poachers. By gathering intelligence from local communities, RPUs also proactively prevent poaching attempts before they take place. RPUs are effective in protecting the rhino from poachers – only five Sumatran rhinos have been lost to poachers since the inception of the program, and no Javan rhinos have been killed.

Eleven patrol units operate in Bukit Barisan Selatan National Park in Sumatra, one of the highest priority areas for Sumatran megafauna. Approximately 15 Sumatran rhino inhabit the Park, along with 40–50 Sumatran tigers and around 500 Asian elephants. Nine patrol units operate in Way Kambas National Park, which has a resident population of about 30 Sumatran rhino and is also the site of the Sumatran Rhino Sanctuary. Five patrol units operate in Ujung Kulon National Park, home to the only remaining viable population of Javan rhinos in the world.

=== Sumatran Rhino Sanctuary ===
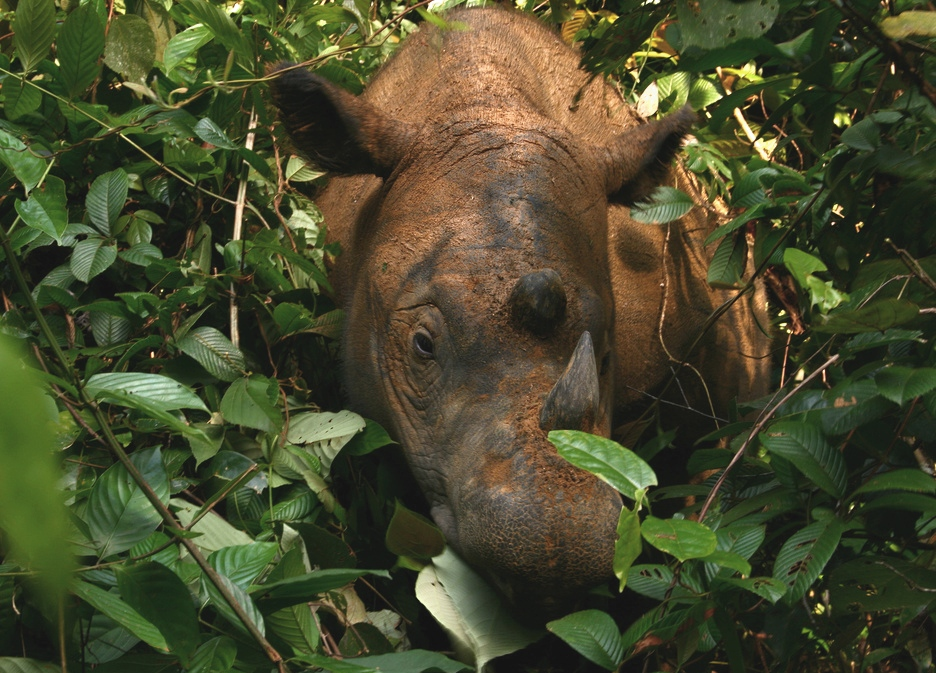
Sumatran Rhino Rosa in the Way Kambas National Park

Because of the challenges and uncertainties of conserving the Sumatran rhino, the IUCN Species Survival Commission's Asian Rhino Specialist Group recommended developing a captive breeding program as part of a larger population management strategy. In the early 1990s, managed propagation centers (known as "sanctuaries") were developed in native habitat in the range states, to which some captive rhinos were repatriated. The first center is the Sumatran Rhino Sanctuary (SRS) in Way Kambas National Park, Sumatra, Indonesia. The SRS encompasses 100 hectares (250 acres) for propagation, research, and education, and received its first rhino in 1998. Until recently, the Sanctuary held only one pair of animals, which were not reproductively sound. The SRS is now home to nine animals, including calves born in 2012, 2016, 2022, and 2023. It is staffed by two full-time Indonesian veterinarians, 11 keepers, several administrative and support staff, and protection units.

Over the years, a number of circumstantial, medical, and management problems have been addressed and overcome. As a result, within the last decade, the husbandry and captive propagation of Sumatran rhinos has passed from its infancy to its adolescence. The International Rhino Foundation has been steadfastly working to address these issues with the expertise of numerous veterinarians and reproductive biologists.

The ten Sumatran rhinos living at the Sumatran Rhino Sanctuary serve as ambassadors for their wild counterparts; instruments for education for local communities and the general public; an "insurance population" that can be used to re-establish or revitalize wild populations that have been eliminated or debilitated; an invaluable resource for basic and applied biological research; and, in the future, as sources of animals for reintroductions, once threats have been ameliorated in the wild.

=== Indian Rhino Vision 2020 ===
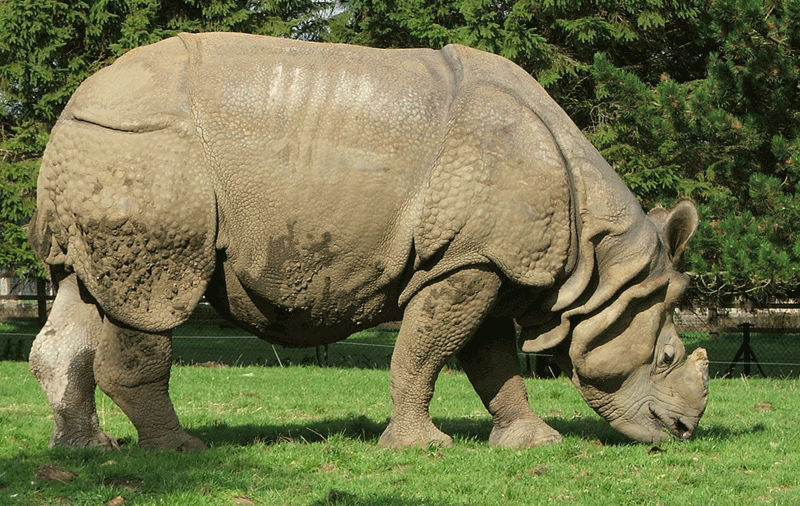
Indian rhinoceros

In 2007, in partnership with the Assam Forest Department, WWF-India, and the USFWS, the International Rhino Foundation embarked on a project, Indian Rhino Vision 2020, with the aim of increasing the population of Indian rhinos in Assam, India, to 3,000 in at least seven protected areas by the year 2020. The first translocations, from Pabitora to Manas National Park, took place in April 2008. Animals were radio-collared and regularly monitored to gauge the success of the reintroduction process. Joint government/community patrol units regularly patrolled the park to prevent poaching and encroachment and to monitor the new rhino population. Over the next 4 years, IRV 2020 moved 18 Indian rhinos from Pobitora Wildlife Sanctuary and Kaziranga National Park to Manas National Park, a protected area and UNESCO World Heritage site that had previously been home to a large rhino population before the poaching crisis. An additional eight rhinos were moved to Manas by the Centre for Wildlife Rehabilitation and Conservation. In mid-2012, one of the female rhinos gave birth to the first calf born in Manas since rhino reintroductions began. Thirteen more rhinos births, including one second generation calf, have been born in the park since then – a sign that the translocated animals are adapting well to their new home.

Unfortunately, this population has also been touched by poaching – part of a region-wide increase in poaching in 2012-2013. After losing eight animals, IRV 2020 halted rhino translocations to Manas in 2013 to focus on improving security. Training in new patrolling methods, along with the support of new park leadership, has made a big difference – only one rhino was lost to poaching in Manas in 2014, and the current population of 33 translocated rhinos and new calves continues to thrive.

=== Zimbabwe Lowveld Rhino Program ===
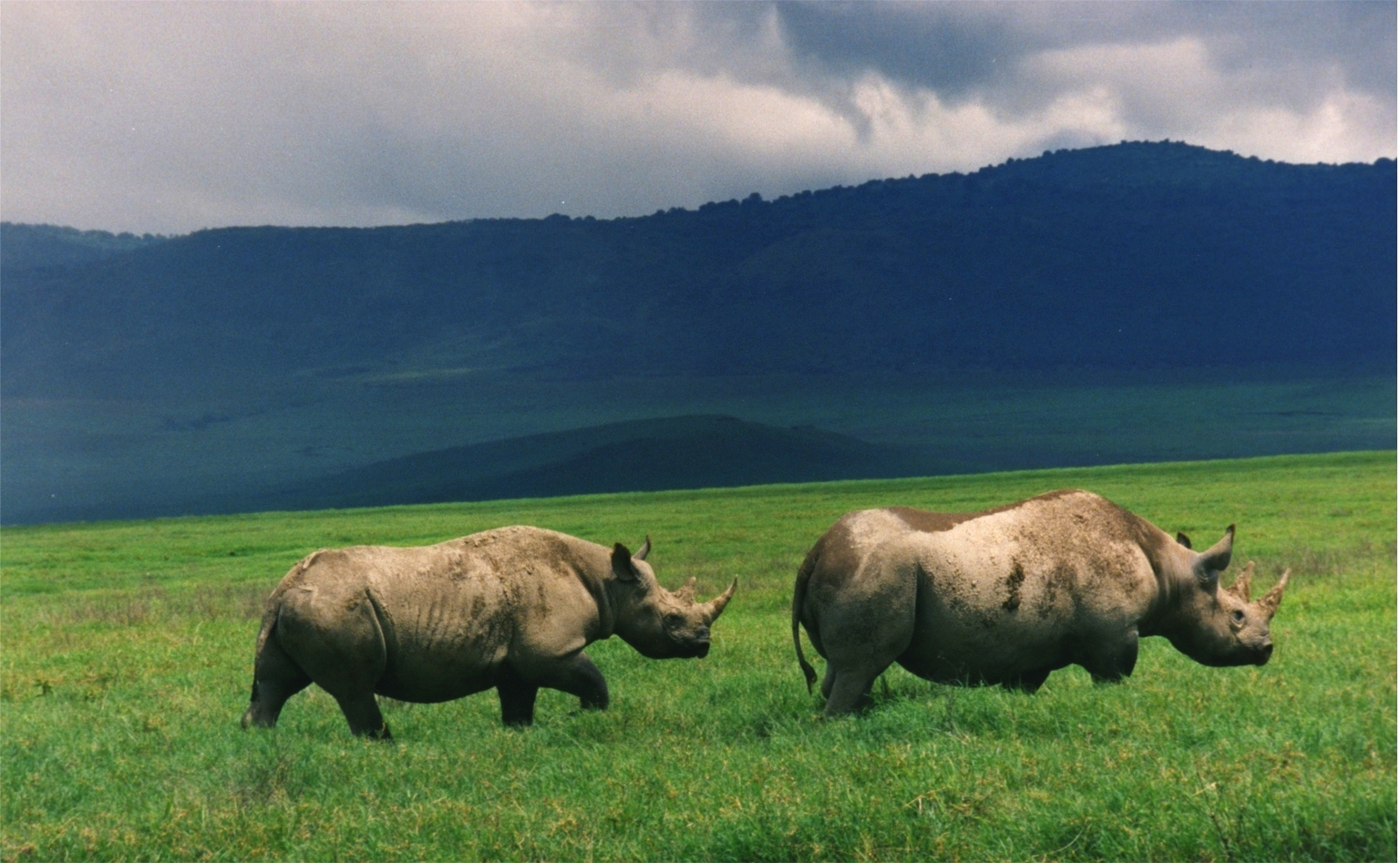
Black Rhinoceros in Ngorongoro Crater, Tanzania

Zimbabwe is home to the world's fourth largest black rhino population after South Africa, Namibia and Kenya. Organized gangs of poachers slaughtered nearly one-quarter of the country's rhinos between 2007 and 2009, as once again southern African nations faced an upsurge in poaching activity. The renewed poaching activity has been driven primarily by demand from Asian markets, particularly Vietnam and China.

Formerly degraded land that was converted from cattle ranges to wildlife management areas, Zimbabwe's Lowveld region is now home to nearly 90% of the country's rhino population. These large land tracts operate as wildlife-based businesses that help safeguard a variety of threatened species. In early 2008, poaching in Zimbabwe reached critical levels and rhino numbers in the Lowveld began to decline for the first time since populations were established there in the early 1990s.

IRF works primarily in the lowveld conservancies of Zimbabwe.

The Lowveld Rhino Program concentrates its activities in two private conservancies where the majority of the rhino population lives and where there is still significant room for expansion – Save Valley and Bubye Valley Conservancies. The first black rhinos were introduced into Bubye Valley in 2002 – by 2012, the 100th black rhino had been born.

=== Southern Africa Rhino Conservation Program ===
By the end of 2015, 1,342 rhinos had been killed by poachers in South Africa alone, overtaking the 1,215 rhinos slaughtered for their horns in 2014. About two-thirds of the killing has taken place in Kruger National Park, which shares a 221 porous miles of its 621-mile border with Mozambique.

IRF's "Operation: Stop Poaching Now" campaign aims to raise awareness and funding for 10 Ways to Fight Rhino Poaching:

- Boots on the Ground
- Special Training
- Early Warning and Community Involvement
- Investigation and Forensic Techniques
- Rhino Dogs
- Law Enforcement Crackdown
- Poaching Deterrents
- Translocating Rhinos to Safety
- Intensive Monitoring and Tracking
- Demand Reduction

==== Botswana ====
In an effort to protect and increase the world's black rhino population by moving animals from a high-risk location to a new, safer area, in March 2014, IRF and partner Wilderness Safaris secured six black rhinos from South Africa's Kruger National Park for translocation to Botswana's Moremi Game Reserve. The group included one adult male, one pregnant adult female, two sub-adult males and two sub-adult females. An additional 14 black rhinos were captured in South Africa's North West Parks from in late May/early June and have subsequently been transported and released in Moremi. This second group included six males and eight females, from 1.5 to more than 10 years of age. With the exception of one bull lost to fighting, all animals are doing well, and are fitted with radio transmitters and tracked regularly.

==== South Africa ====
Great Fish River Nature Reserve covers some 46,000 hectares (110,000 acres) of prime shrubby rhino habitat, which holds a growing population of black rhino that must be protected at all costs. IRF's grants helped to build and equip new guard posts in areas where it was previously difficult for staff to operate because of a lack of accommodations, and has funded a secure communications system for the reserve.

In Phinda Private Game Reserve, also an important rhino area, IRF has funding a rapid response team that can preemptively respond to ever-increasing poaching incursions. Funds have also strengthened relationships with local communities, a valuable source of information that can help to avert poaching, supplied a secure communications system as well as other security measures.
