= Bull (rhinoceros) =

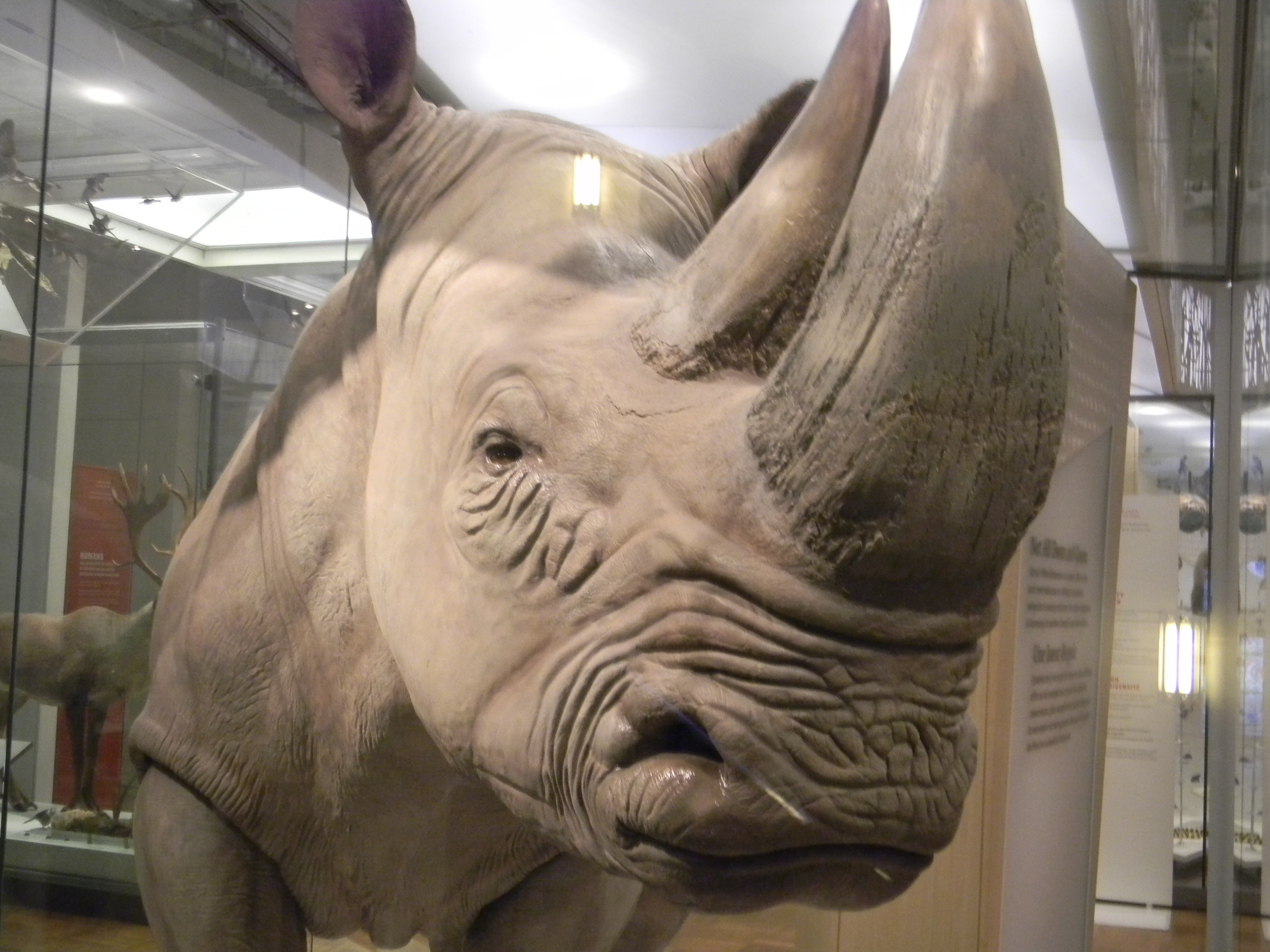
- Species: Ceratotherium simum simum
- Sex: Male
- Born: Mtondo; 1963; South Africa
- Died: 2008 (aged 45-46); Toronto Zoo
- Resting place: Royal Ontario Museum; 43.6675°N 79.3942°W
- Years active: 35
- Known for: Conservation success story
- Tricks: Responds to keeper's calls
- Offspring: Shaboola, Abeeku, Atu
- Weight: 4,500 lb
- Height: 5 ft (1.5 m)
- Appearance: Long lifespan lead to notably large horns

Bull was an individual male southern white rhinoceros and a famous conservation success story for his species. Southern white rhinos were thought to be extinct in the late 1800s until a small herd was discovered. Since then, rhinos like Bull have been part of various international breeding programs. As a result, their population is now close to 20,000, classifying them as Near Threatened and making them the only species of rhinoceros that is not endangered.

Bull was born in South Africa and was eventually moved to North America, where he lived in the San Diego Wild Animal Park and Toronto Zoo until his death in 2008. He can now be seen in the Schad Gallery of Biodiversity in the Royal Ontario Museum (ROM) in Toronto as part of the museum's collection of Iconic Objects.

== Early life ==
Bull was born in the wild in South Africa, and for this reason, his age can only be estimated. However, after undergoing a series of examinations, specialists were able to estimate his age to be around 9–10 years at the time of his capture, so his birth year was recorded to be 1963. Although white rhinos are protected in South Africa, Bull and many others were taken into captivity under a breeding program in order to ensure the survival of the species should an unexpected disaster befall the main population.

At the time of the rhino’s capture, he was named “Mtondo”, which translates from Zulu as a term for male reproductive organs.

== San Diego Wild Animal Park ==
Shortly after his capture, Mtondo was moved to different locations across North America, where he was studied as part of a conservation effort. His first North American home was the San Diego Wild Animal Park Zoo. He remained at this location until 1974, when he was transferred to the Toronto Zoo in Ontario, Canada.

== Toronto Zoo ==
Following his time in the San Diego Wild Animal Park, the rhino spent the remainder of his life in the Toronto Zoo, with Ron Gilmore acting as his keeper.

Upon arriving at the Toronto Zoo, Mtondo’s name was officially changed to “Bull”. Although unconfirmed, it is believed that this was due to the sexual nature of the previous name, which was deemed unfitting.

Throughout his life, Bull was found to be gentle towards humans and would approach the front of his enclosure, allowing zoo visitors to pet him. He became especially close with his keeper, Gilmore, and would respond to the sound of his voice. On two separate occasions, faults were discovered in Bull's enclosure, but instead of fleeing, the rhino could be calmly called over by his keeper. Around other rhinos, however, Bull was often aggressive. He was known to hit other rhinos with his horns if provoked.

=== Daily routine ===
Bull was fed three meals a day, eating 5-10 lbs of hay at breakfast and lunch and 30 lbs of hay at dinner along with 15-20 lbs of compressed grains, vegetables and vitamins. He would occasionally enjoy treats such as apples, pears and sweet oats with bran and molasses.

Living in a colder Canadian climate meant that Bull’s daily activities varied with the seasons. During the warm summer months, he would be showered after breakfast, something he greatly enjoyed, and would then proceed to the exhibit area of his enclosure either on his own or in the company of a number of female rhinos. During colder weather, if Bull were to proceed outside, he wouldn't be showered, as this would have lowered his body temperature too significantly. Once temperatures began to fall below freezing, Bull was to remain indoors. Although he was given plastic balls to play with, he often slept more during the winter.

=== Children ===
During his time at the Toronto Zoo, Bull sired three children. The first was a female, Shaboola, in 1979. She remained in the Toronto Zoo, but was kept in a separate enclosure from her father to prevent interbreeding. The second was Abeeku, a male, in 1985, who was sent to live in Germany. The last was another male in 1990, Atu, who was sold to a game park in Hemmingford, Quebec.

== Death ==
Although Bull never suffered any major illnesses throughout his life, he became severely arthritic in 2008. At this point, he began having difficulties supporting his own weight while standing. He died in 2008.

== Royal Ontario Museum ==
Following Bull's death, the Toronto Zoo contacted the ROM to enquire into whether the museum was interested in taking on the rhino as an exhibit. At this time, the Schad Gallery of Biodiversity was in need of a Life in Crisis centerpiece. After museum staff assessed transportation options and determined that it was physically possible to transport the rhino into the second-floor gallery and obtained a grant from the Louise Hawley Stone Charitable Trust, they accepted Bull into their collection.

=== Taxidermy process ===
Once in possession of Bull, the ROM contacted Len Murphy of Pine Ridge Taxidermy in Baltimore, Ontario to have him stuffed. Bull was then shipped to the facility via flatbed truck. Under Murphy's care, Bull's outer skin was removed and re-cast with a mould. As Murphy had been to the Toronto Zoo to study Bull during his lifetime, he was able to recreate the animal's exact features and wrinkles.

The entire taxidermy process took over a year to complete. This began with the removal of the hide, which was then cured with salt and drained. It was then shaved with a double-handed knife, re-salted and hung to dry. At this point, the hide weighed 700 lbs and was sent to soak in a 50-gallon drum of formic acid before being shaven once more to reach a thickness of only 1/16 inch. It was then placed in formic acid once more and then oiled. The final weight of the hide was 53 lbs.

Several layers of artificial materials were then used to fill the hide. A Styrofoam core was constructed and coated in papier-mâché, to increase its size. Modelling clay was used to shape Bull’s muscles. His horns, which grew to be quite large due to his age, were too damaged to use, so fiberglass recreations were constructed.

=== Display ===
The completed rhino was officially revealed at the ROM in May 2009 at a special gala in his honor. Here, he became one of the museum’s first Iconic Objects and can still be found in the Schad Gallery of Biodiversity.

While his bones were separated from the hide during the taxidermy process, they are also kept under the ROM's care and are now part of the museum's skeleton collection.
