= Ceratotherium mauritanicum =

Ceratotherium mauritanicum Temporal range: 2.6–0.125 Ma Late Pliocene – early Late Pleistocene

Scientific classification
- Kingdom: Animalia
- Phylum: Chordata
- Class: Mammalia
- Infraclass: Placentalia
- Order: Perissodactyla
- Family: Rhinocerotidae
- Genus: Ceratotherium
- Species: †C. mauritanicum

Binomial name
- †Ceratotherium mauritanicum (Pomel, 1888)

Synonyms
- Ceratotherium efficax (Dietrich, 1942)

Extinct species of rhinoceros

Ceratotherium mauritanicum is an extinct species of African rhinoceros whose fossils are primarily known from the Late Pliocene to early Late Pleistocene of North Africa, specifically in Morocco, Tunisia, and Algeria. The classification of certain Pliocene remains from East Africa as C. mauritanicum is debated, which in turn affects discussions about whether it was directly ancestral to the modern white rhinoceros (Ceratotherium simum). Current evidence suggests that C. mauritanicum was replaced in North Africa by C. simum during the early Late Pleistocene, between approximately 120,000 and 57,000 years ago.

== Taxonomy and characteristics ==
The phylogenetic position of Ceratotherium mauritanicum is subject to ongoing scientific discussion. One model, proposed by Geraads (2005), places it in a direct ancestral line between the earlier Ceratotherium neumayri (itself of debated generic placement) and the extant C. simum. An alternative hypothesis, suggested by Hernesniemi et al. (2011), posits C. mauritanicum as a descendant of Ceratotherium efficax and an extinct sister taxon to C. simum. This view suggests that C. mauritanicum retained more primitive characteristics in North Africa while the Ceratotherium lineage underwent more progressive evolution in eastern and southern Africa.

The relationship between C. mauritanicum and Ceratotherium efficax (described from Pliocene East African fossils) is particularly complex. Some Pliocene fossils from East Africa have been attributed to C. mauritanicum by some authors, while the 2011 study by Hernesniemi et al. proposed these represented the distinct, more primitive C. efficax. However, a subsequent study by Geraads (2020) concluded that C. efficax is synonymous with C. mauritanicum, effectively lumping these Pliocene East African forms into an earlier phase of C. mauritanicum. This synonymy is reflected in the speciesbox.

Ceratotherium mauritanicum was widely distributed across northwestern Africa during the Quaternary and is frequently found in association with archaeological sites. Petroglyphs (rock carvings) in North Africa sometimes depict rhinoceroses, though their schematic nature often makes species identification difficult. It is plausible that carvings showing characteristics typical of the white rhinoceros may actually represent C. mauritanicum, which likely had a very similar external appearance to C. simum. Morphologically, most characters distinguishing C. mauritanicum from C. simum involve minor proportional differences. The most readily discernible distinction is considered to be the more robust limb bones, particularly the metapodials, of C. simum.

Recent chronological studies indicate that C. mauritanicum disappeared from North Africa and was replaced by the modern white rhinoceros (C. simum) during a humid "Green Sahara" period in the early Late Pleistocene, specifically between 120,000 and 57,000 years ago.

== Paleoecology ==
The paleoecology of Ceratotherium mauritanicum is thought to mirror that of the extant C. simum. It likely inhabited open savannah landscapes that featured sufficient water sources and abundant grasses, a type of biome that has largely vanished from the Maghreb region since the Early Holocene. Its diet was probably dominated by grass, consistent with its classification as a grazer.
