= Kigio Wildlife Conservancy =

Kenyan nature preserve

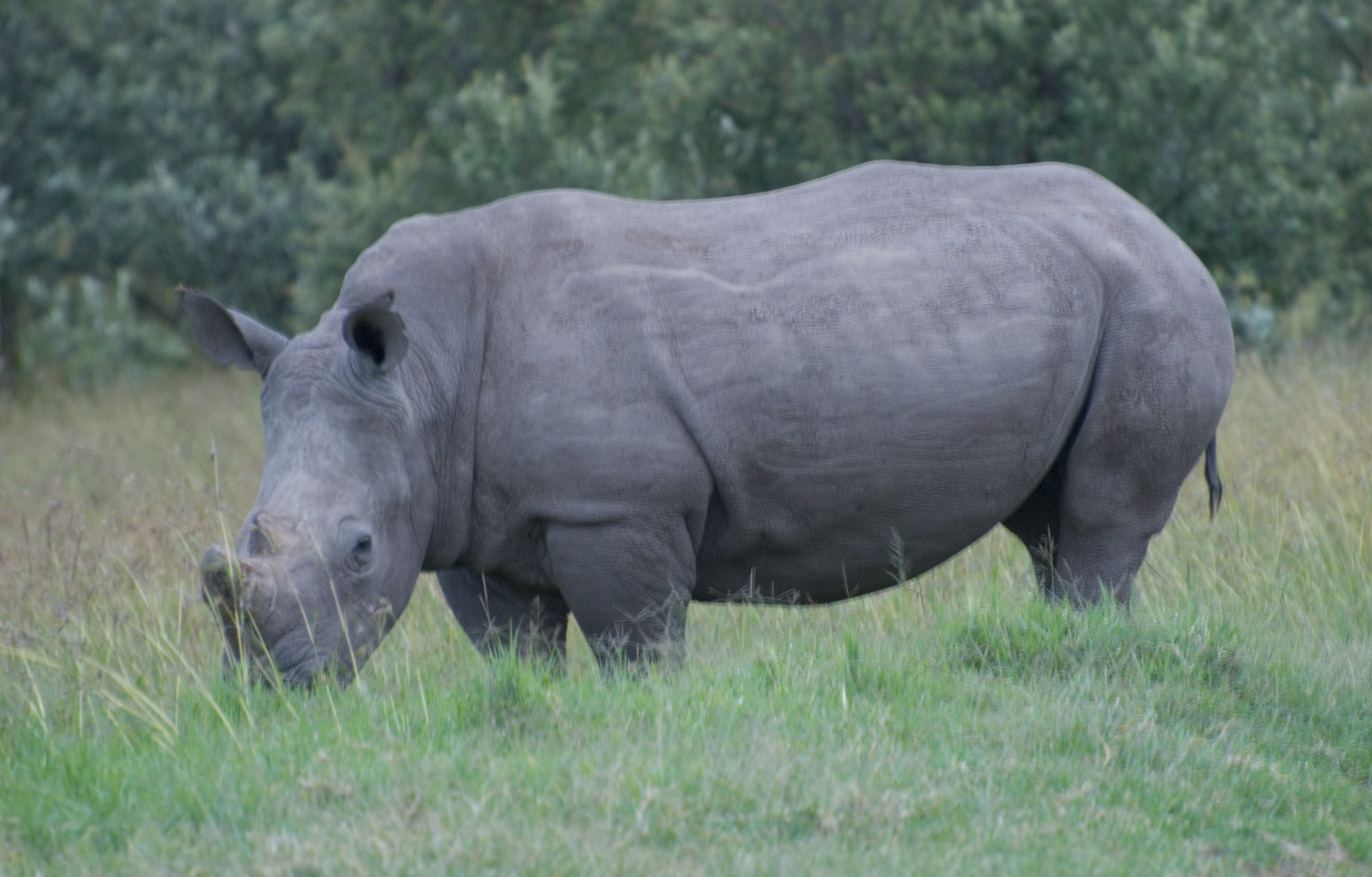
- A southern white rhinoceros in Kigio conservancy, 2007 (evening)

- Location within Kenya
- Location: Rift Valley Province, Kenya
- Nearest city: Nairobi
- Coordinates: 0°34′03″S 36°23′36″E
- Area: 3,500 acres (1,400 ha)
- Established: 1997
- Website: www.kigio.com

The Kigio Wildlife Conservancy is a protected Conservancy near Gilgil in the Great Rift Valley of Kenya. It is owned and operated by the local community.

== Location ==
The conservancy, which covers 3,500 acres (1,400 ha), is located between Lake Nakuru and Lake Naivasha. Kigio Conservancy derives its name from the area where the community that owns it came from. Kigio was originally a cattle ranch owned by white settlers. After buying the ranch, the local community decided that there could be more revenue from eco-tourism. Fees now provide income for the community and help cover the cost of maintenance. Several organizations have provided funding for infrastructure and conservation including Tusk Trust, Born Free Foundation, Lewa Wildlife Conservancy, and Projects Abroad.

== Flora and fauna ==
The Kigio Wildlife Conservancy contains diverse habitats including short grass, Leleshwa shrub, euphorbia woodlands, and riverine woodlands. Almost 100 indigenous plant species are protected in the conservancy.There are over three hundred bird species including what is said to be the world's largest population of grey-crested helmetshrikes. There are about 3,500 head of large mammals, up from about 100 head in 1996. Grazing animals include African buffalo, common eland, impala, waterbuck, Grant's gazelle, Thomson's gazelle and Grant's zebra. Other species include spotted hyena, African leopard, hippopotamus, caracal, aardvark, aardwolf, honey badger and spring hare.

The endangered Rothschild's giraffe is also found here. After he last giraffe in the region was killed by poachers in 1996, the management of the reserve applied to the Kenya Wildlife Service to have Rothschild's giraffe moved to the conservancy. This was granted on condition that the conservancy was fenced, which was done with funding from the European Union and the Born Free Foundation.The conservancy, bounded by the Malewa River to the east, is now enclosed by an electric fence on the three other sides.The BBC programme, Born to be Wild included an episode that covered the process of relocating the giraffes. Eight Rothschild's giraffe moved from Lake Nakuru National Park in 2002, and by 2012 there were almost thirty.

== Visitors ==
The conservancy offers accommodation at Malewa Wildlife Lodge and Kigio Wildlife Camp, both built with traditional techniques and materials. Guests may participate in activities that have minimal impact on the environment, including guided walks, cycling and fishing. They may also take game-spotting drives in open-sided 4x4 vehicles during the day or at night. Locally-made craft works are also sold, with much of the proceeds going to the community fund.
