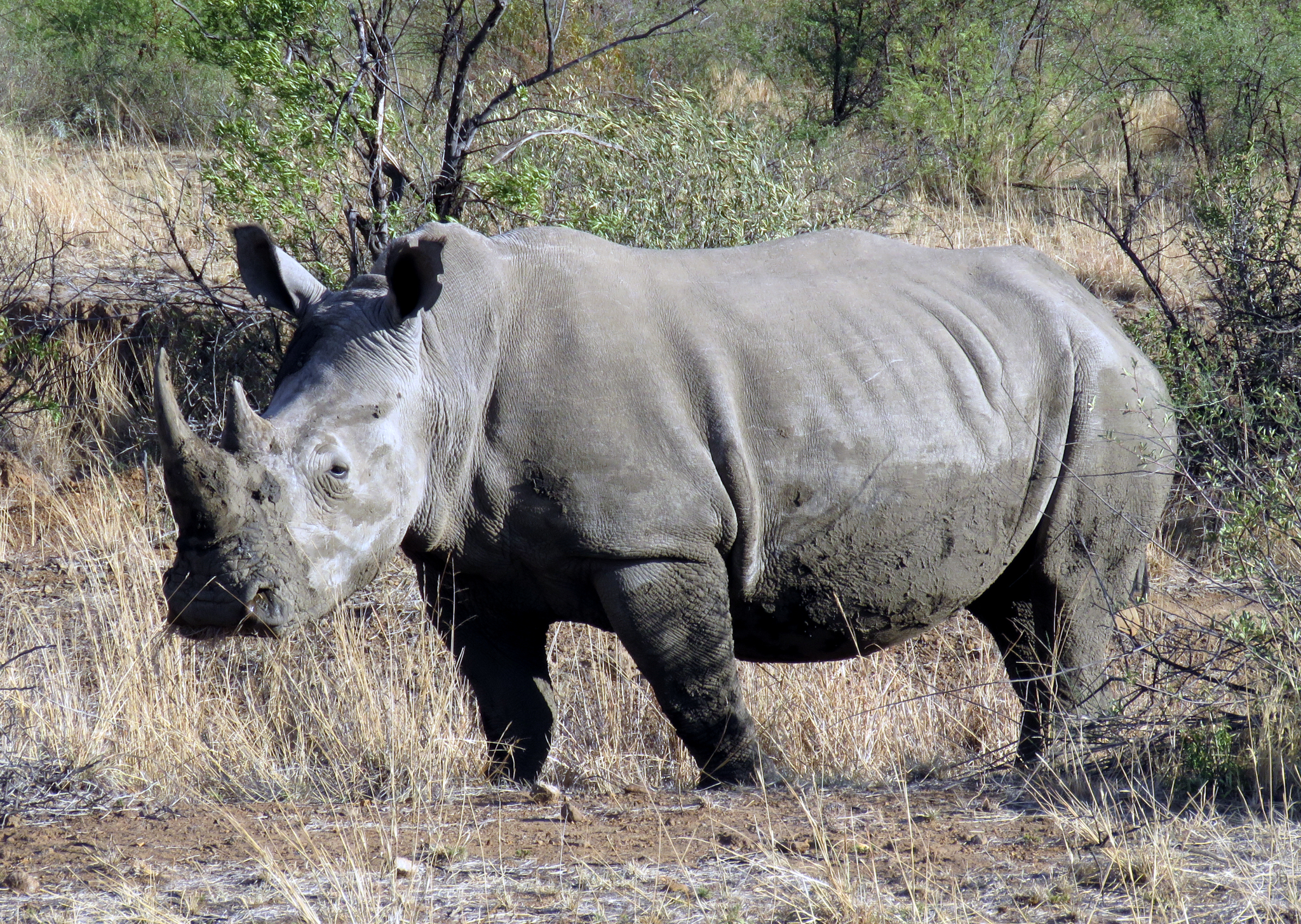
- A southern white rhinoceros in Pilanesberg National Park, South Africa

Conservation status
- Near Threatened (IUCN 3.1)
- CITES Appendix I (Note: Ceratotherium simum POOSAY populations of South Africa and Eswatini are included in Appendix II for the exclusive purpose of allowing international trade in live animals to appropriate and acceptable destinations and hunting trophies. The population of Namibia is included in Appendix II for the exclusive purpose of allowing international trade in live animals for in-situ conservation only and only within the natural and historical range of Ceratotherium simum in Africa.)

Scientific classification
- Kingdom: Animalia
- Phylum: Chordata
- Class: Mammalia
- Order: Perissodactyla
- Family: Rhinocerotidae
- Genus: Ceratotherium
- Species: C. simum
- Subspecies: C. s. simum

Trinomial name
- Ceratotherium simum simum (Burchell, 1817)
- Southern white rhino distribution according to the IUCN (as of 2020). Extant (resident) Extant and reintroduced (resident) Extant and assisted colonisation (resident) Presence uncertain & assisted colonisation

Synonyms
- Ceratotherium simum burchellii (Desmarest, 1822); Ceratotherium simum oswellii (Elliot, 1847); Ceratotherium simum kiaboaba (Murray, 1866)

= Southern white rhinoceros =

Subspecies of rhinoceros

The southern white rhinoceros or southern white rhino (Ceratotherium simum simum) is one of the two subspecies of the white rhinoceros (the other being the much rarer northern white rhinoceros). It is the most common and widespread subspecies of rhinoceros.

== Taxonomic and evolutionary history ==
The southern white rhinoceros is the nominate subspecies; it was given the scientific name Ceratotherium simum simum by the English explorer William John Burchell in the 1810s. The subspecies is also known as Burchell's rhinoceros (Ceratotherium simum burchellii) after Burchell and Oswell's rhinoceros (Ceratotherium simum oswellii) after William Cotton Oswell, respectively. However, these are considered synonyms of its original scientific.

Ceratotherium simum kiaboaba (or Rhinoceros kiaboaba), also known as straight-horned rhinoceros, was proposed as a different subspecies (or species) found near Lake Ngami and north of the Kalahari Desert. However, it is now considered part of the southern white rhinoceros and ranges throughout southern Africa.

Following the phylogenetic species concept, research in 2010 suggested the southern and northern white rhinoceros may be different species, rather than subspecies, in which case the correct scientific name for the northern subspecies is Ceratotherium cottoni and the southern subspecies should be known as simply Ceratotherium simum. Distinct morphological and genetic differences suggest the two proposed species have been separated for at least a million years.

== Physical descriptions ==
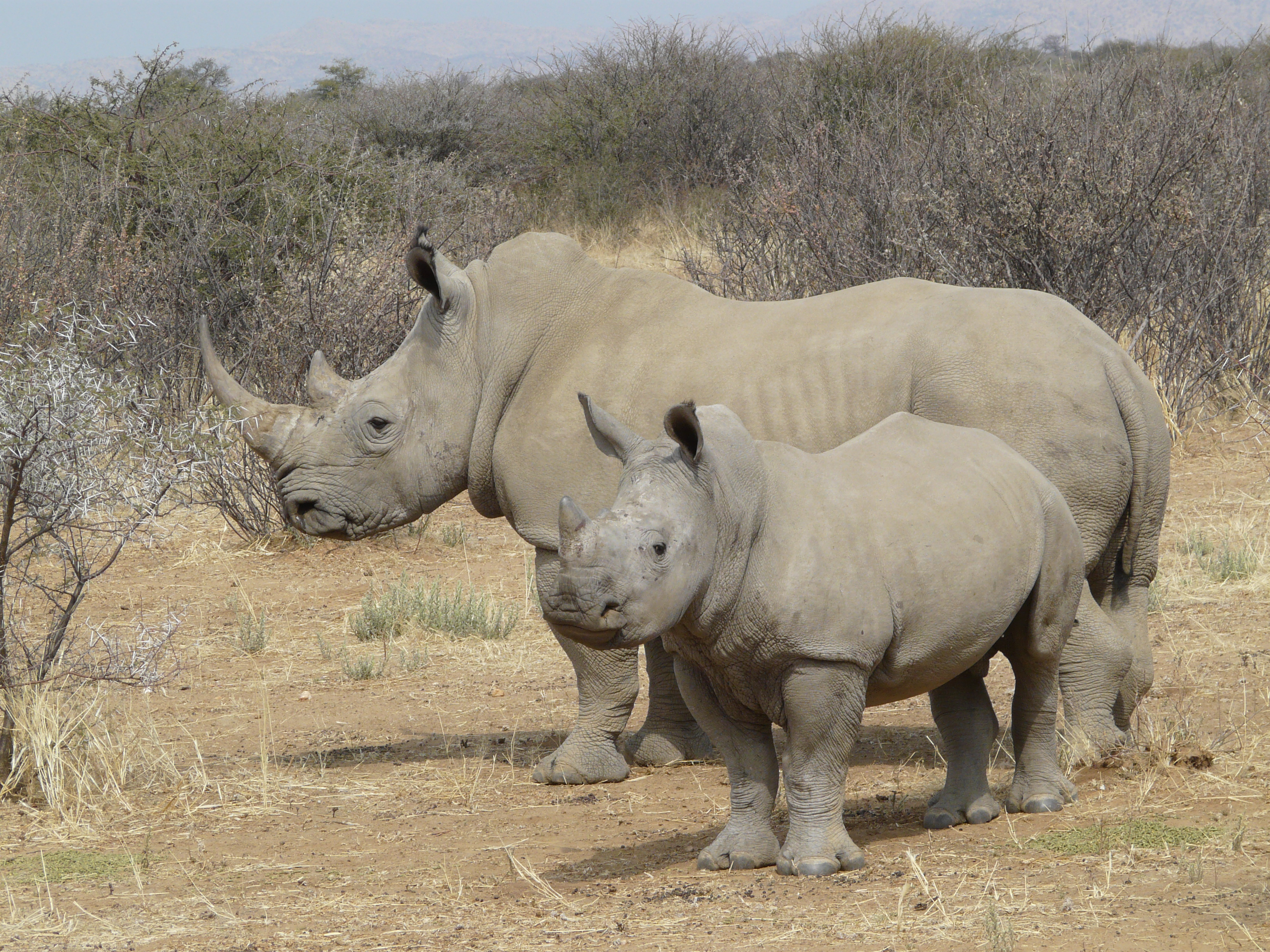
A southern white rhino mother with calf in Namibia.

The southern white rhinoceros is one of largest and heaviest land animals in the world. It has an immense body and large head, a short neck and broad chest. Females weigh around 1,600–1,700 kg (3,530–3,750 lb) and males around 2,000–2,300 kg (4,410–5,070 lb), with specimens of up to 3,600 kilograms (7,940 lb) considered reliable, and larger sizes up to 4,500 kg (9,920 lb) claimed but not verified. The head-and-body length is 3.35–4 m (11.0–13.1 ft) and a shoulder height of 160–186 cm (5.25–6.10 ft). It has two horns on its snout. The front horn is larger than the other horn and averages 60 cm (24 in) in length and can reach 166 cm (65 in) in females. Females usually have longer but thinner horns than the males, who have larger but shorter ones. The southern white rhinoceros also has a prominent muscular hump that supports its large head. The colour of this animal can range from yellowish brown to slate grey. Most of its body hair is found on the ear fringes and tail bristles, with the rest distributed sparsely over the rest of the body. The southern white rhino has a distinctive flat, broad mouth that is used for grazing. Southern white rhinos are strictly herbivores (graminivores) that feed on short grasses.

Their Lifespan is up to 50 years in the wild.

== Mating and reproduction ==
Little is known about southern white rhinoceros' mating habits, but females reproduce every 2–3 years. They give birth to a single calf, after a gestation period that lasts around 16 months. Males are never directly involved in the raising of calves; in rare instances, certain rogue individuals may even kill calves that they perceive as future competition, both for resources and bloodline dominance. Newborn calves weigh about 45 kg (100 pounds) at birth. Young usually become independent in 2–3 years.

== Habitat and distribution ==
Southern white rhino population

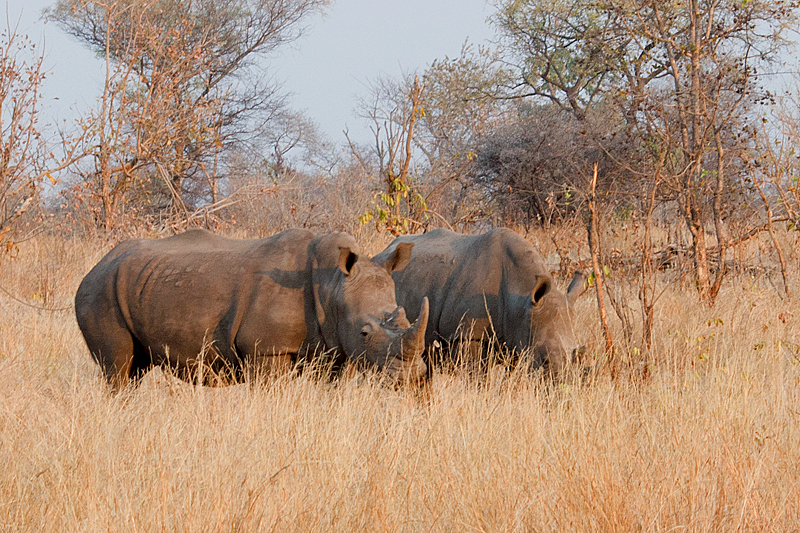
A southern white rhino pair at Mosi-oa-Tunya National Park, Zambia.

The southern white rhino lives in the grasslands, savannahs, and shrublands of southern Africa, ranging from South Africa to Zambia. About 98.5% of southern white rhino live in just five countries: South Africa, Namibia, Zimbabwe, Kenya and Uganda.

== Population and threats ==
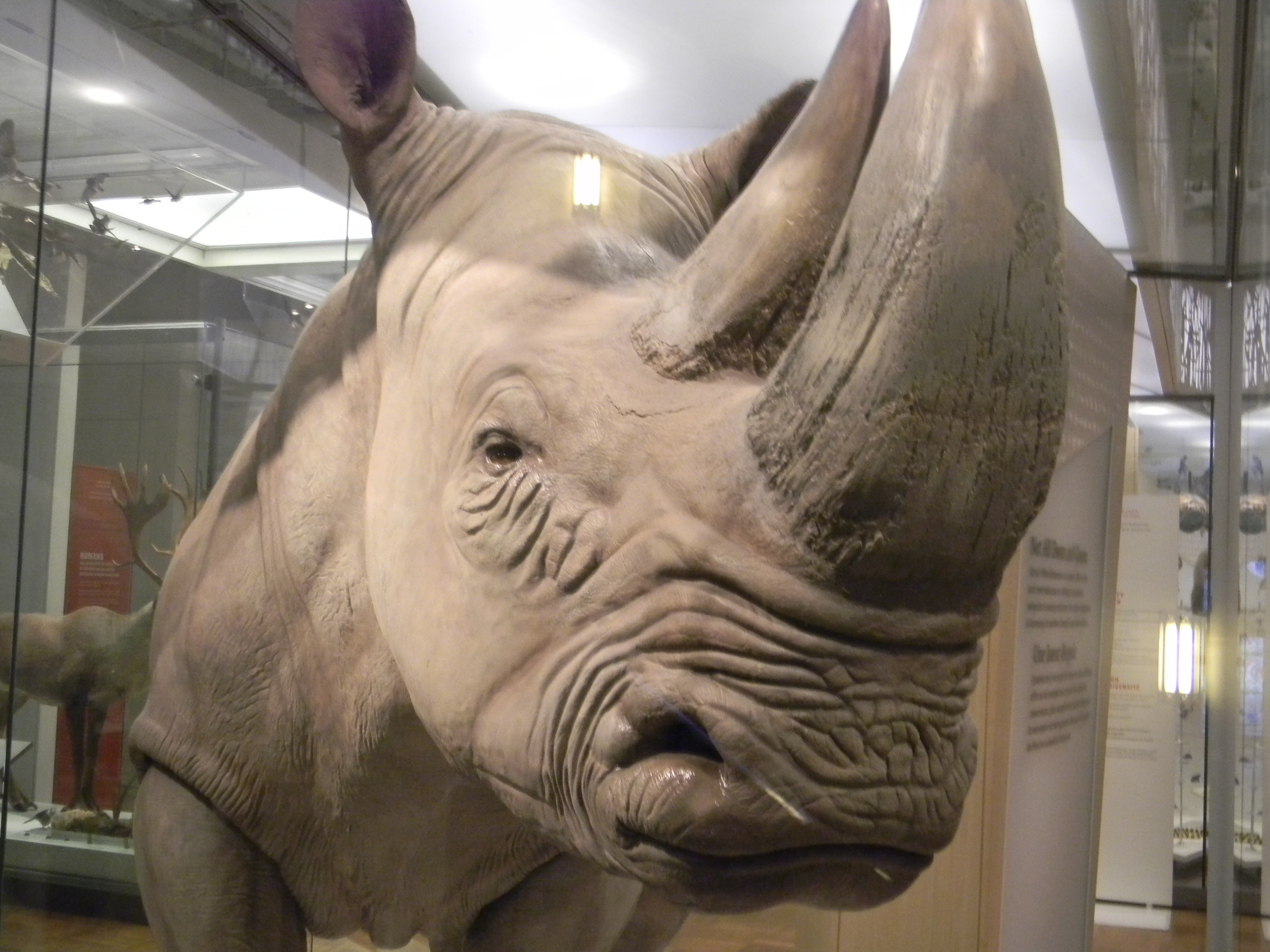
Taxidermied specimen, Royal Ontario Museum

The southern white rhino is listed as Near Threatened; it is mostly threatened by habitat loss and poaching for rhino horn for use in traditional Chinese medicine.

The southern white rhino was nearly extinct near the end of the 19th century having been reduced to a population of approximately 20–50 animals in KwaZulu-Natal due to sport hunting and land clearance. Numbers increased rapidly from 1992 to 2010, due to intensive protection and translocation efforts, however population growth then slowed as poaching increased, with numbers declining from 2012 to 2017. An approximate 15% decline in estimated numbers between 2012 and 2017 was primarily due to reductions in populations within South Africa's Kruger National Park. Poaching rates peaked in 2014 and as of December 2017, there were an estimated 18,064 southern white rhino in the wild with populations being assessed as Near Threatened since 2002.

White rhino trophy hunting was legalized and regulated in 1968, and after initial miscalculations is now generally seen to have assisted in the species' recovery by providing incentives for landowners to boost rhino populations.

== Conservation status ==
The subspecies is protected under the Convention on International Trade in Endangered Species (CITES) meaning international import/export (including in parts/derivatives) is regulated by the CITES permit system. Populations of South Africa, Eswatini and Namibia are listed in CITES Appendix II with strict conditions while all other populations are listed in CITES Appendix I.

=== Introduction/reintroduction projects ===
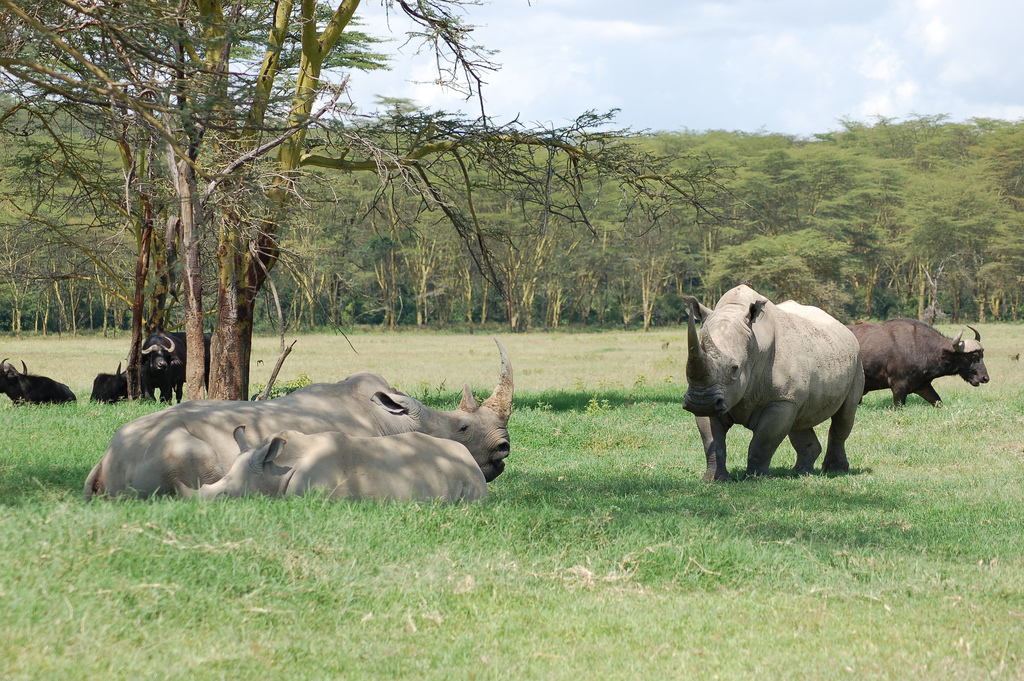
A southern white rhinoceros crash in Lake Nakuru, Kenya.

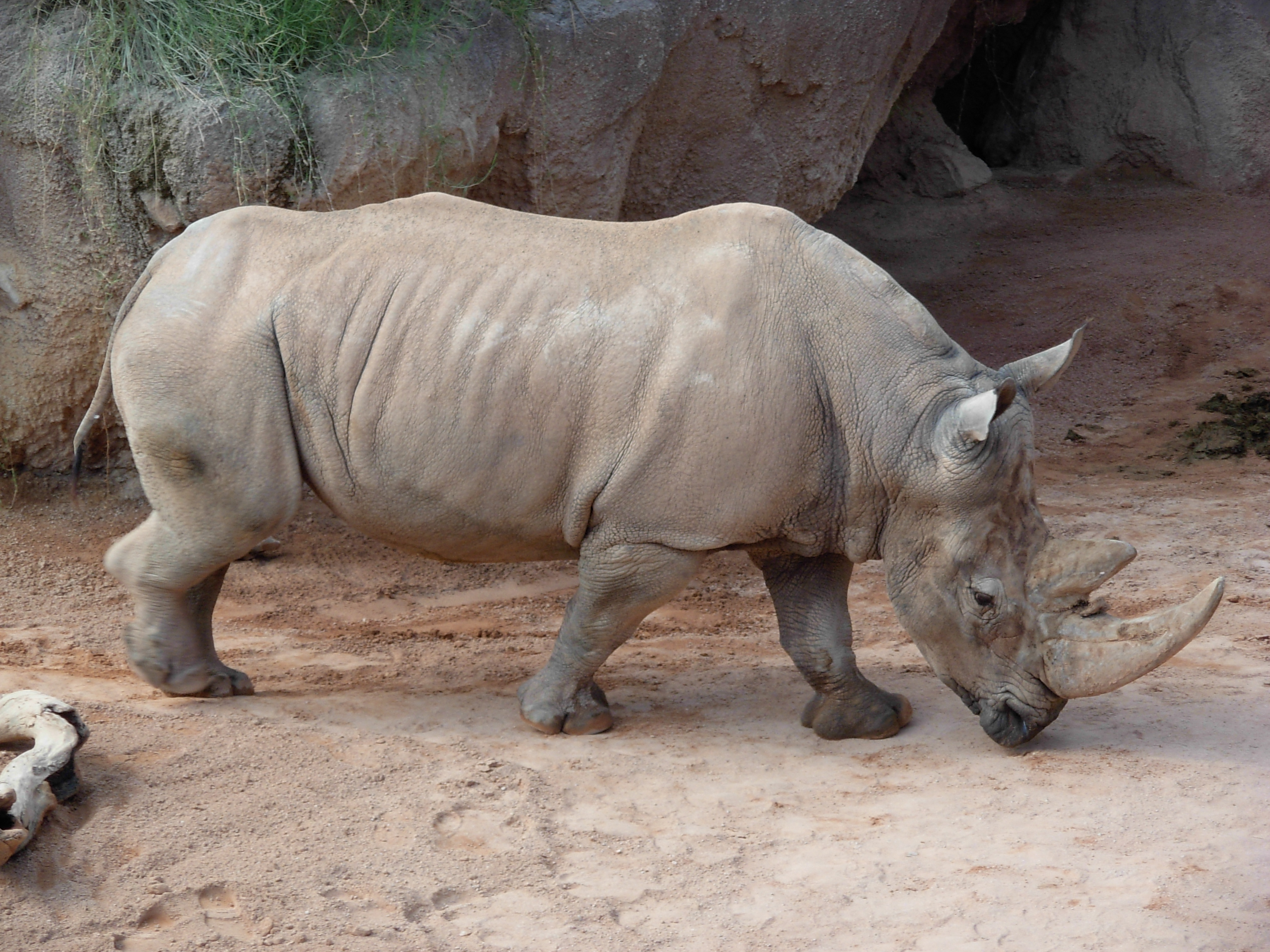
A captive southern white rhinoceros in Bioparc Valencia, Valencia, Spain.

There are small, reintroduced populations within the historical range of the southern white rhinoceros in Botswana, Eswatini, Namibia, Zambia, Zimbabwe and in the southwest of the Democratic Republic of the Congo, while a small population survives in Mozambique. Populations have also been introduced outside of the former range of the species to Kenya, Uganda and Zambia, where their northern relatives used to occur. The southern white rhinoceros has been reintroduced into the Ziwa Rhino Sanctuary in Uganda, and in the Lake Nakuru National Park and the Kigio Wildlife Conservancy in Kenya.

In 2010, nine southern white rhinoceroses were imported from South Africa, shipped to the Yunnan Province in southwestern China, where they were kept in an animal-wildlife park for quarantine and acclimatisation. In March 2013, seven of the animals were shipped to the Laiyanghe National Forest Park, a habitat where Sumatran and Javan rhinoceros once roamed. The remaining two southern white rhinos began the process of being released into the wild on May 13, 2014.

In 2023, African Parks, purchased the then-largest privately owned herd of southern white rhinos, comprising 2,000 of the animals with the aim or introducing part of the herd to reserves. In 2024, they donated 40 of the rhinoceros to the Munywana Conservancy in the southeast of South Africa. In June 10 in same year, 16 white rhinos introduced to Garamba National Park in Democratic Republic of the Congo in 17 years since last northern white rhino has poached in 2006.

=== In captivity ===
Wild-caught southern white rhinoceros will readily breed in captivity when given appropriate living space, veterinary care, food, and water, as well as the presence of multiple female rhinos of breeding age; many white rhinoceroses seen in zoos today are the direct descendants of a cooperative breeding program initiated in the 1970s to increase the population, and maintain genetic diversity, without capturing individuals from the wild. In Escondido, California, 96 calves have been born at the San Diego Zoo Safari Park since its opening in 1972. The nearly 2,000-acre Park, which is the sister-facility of the San Diego Zoo (located 30 miles south in the City of San Diego) has been an international leader in southern white rhinoceros husbandry and breeding.

However, reproductive rates are fairly low among captive-born female southern white rhinoceroses, potentially due to eating a different diet than would be consumed in the wild. Ongoing research, through San Diego Zoo Global, is hoping to not only focus on this, but also on identifying other captive species that are possibly affected and developing new diets and feeding practices aimed at enhancing fertility. When managed correctly, the rate of natural reproduction among captive-born southern white females is relatively successful, as can be seen by the success of John Frederik Hume's rhino-breeding initiative, which currently has an average of 200 natural births per year, and has seen more than 1,800 natural births since 1993. In South Africa, a population of southern white rhinos are being raised on farms and ranches for their horns, along with black rhinos, in an effort to mitigate poaching.
