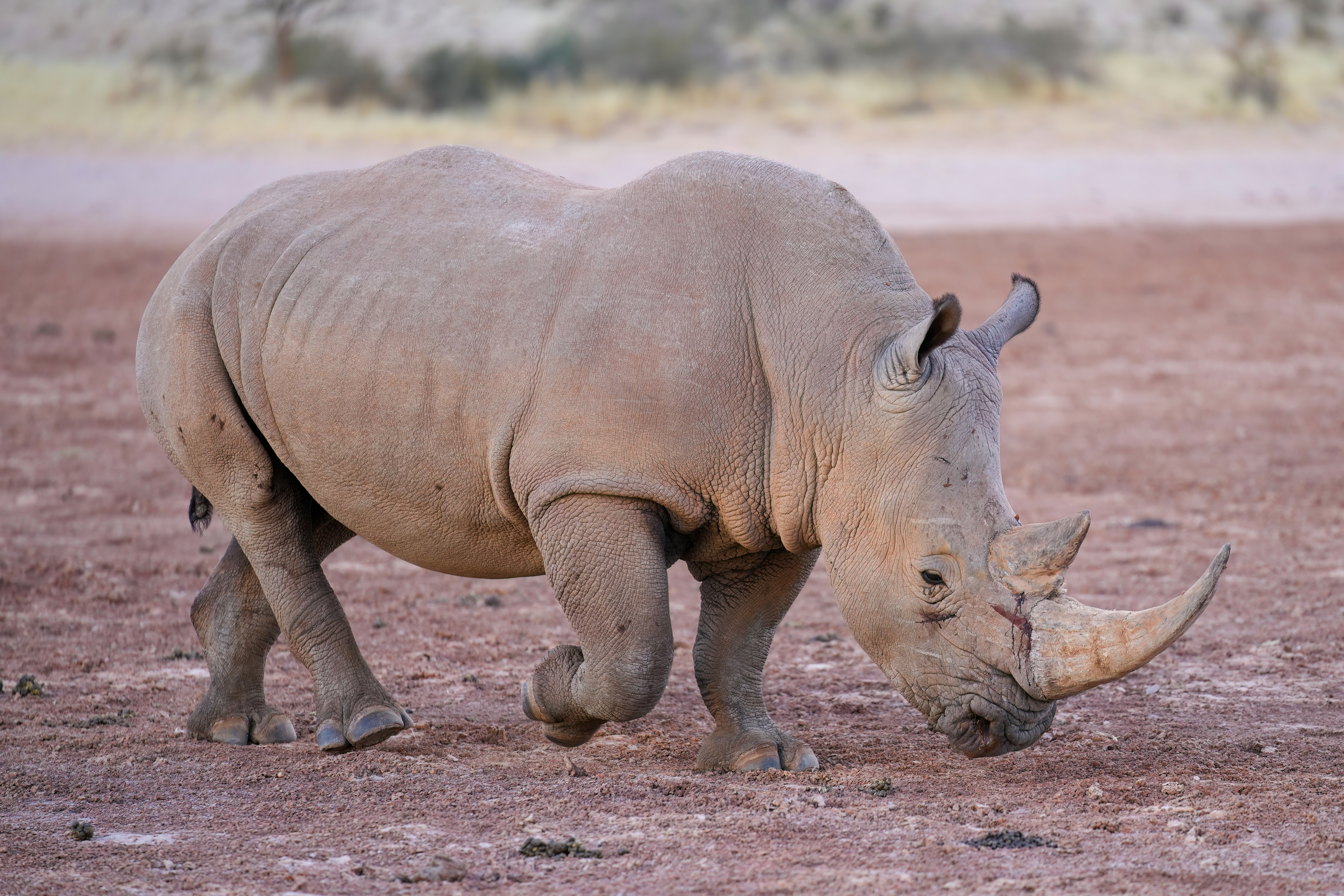
- A male white rhinoceros in Namibia

Conservation status
- Near Threatened (IUCN 3.1)
- CITES Appendix I (Note: Ceratotherium simum simum populations of South Africa and Eswatini are included in Appendix II for the exclusive purpose of allowing international trade in live animals to appropriate and acceptable destinations and hunting trophies. The population of Namibia is included in Appendix II for the exclusive purpose of allowing international trade in live animals for in-situ conservation only and only within the natural and historical range of Ceratotherium simum in Africa.)

Scientific classification
- Kingdom: Animalia
- Phylum: Chordata
- Class: Mammalia
- Order: Perissodactyla
- Family: Rhinocerotidae
- Genus: Ceratotherium
- Species: C. simum

Binomial name
- Ceratotherium simum (Burchell, 1817)

Subspecies
- Ceratotherium simum cottoni (northern); Ceratotherium simum simum (southern)
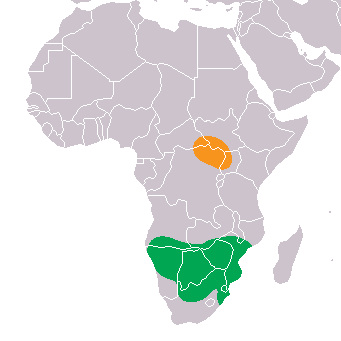
- White rhinoceros original range. Northern (C. s. cottoni) Southern (C. s. simum)
- Northern white rhino distribution according to the IUCN (as of 2020). Extant and assisted colonisation (resident) Extinct Possibly extinct
- Southern white rhino distribution according to the IUCN (as of 2020). Extant (resident) Extant and reintroduced (resident) Extant and assisted colonisation (resident) Presence uncertain and assisted colonisation

Synonyms
- Rhinoceros simum (Burchell, 1817)

= White rhinoceros =

White rhinoceros Temporal range: Early Pleistocene - Recent 1.8–0 Ma

Species of large land mammal

The white rhinoceros, white rhino or square-lipped rhinoceros (Ceratotherium simum) is the largest extant species of rhinoceros. It has a wide mouth used for grazing and is the most social of all rhino species. The white rhinoceros consists of two subspecies: the southern white rhinoceros, with an estimated 17,464 individuals in the wild as of the end of 2023, and the much rarer northern white rhinoceros. The northern subspecies is critically endangered and on the brink of extinction; it has only two confirmed left as of 2018 (two females: Fatu, 24 and Najin, 29, both in captivity at Ol Pejeta). Sudan, the world's last known male northern white rhinoceros, died in Kenya in March 2018. White rhinoceros can run up to 40 mph (64 km/h) for very short bursts. They can maintain speeds of around 30–31 mph (48–50 km/h) for a good amount of time, and they have good stamina.

== Naming ==
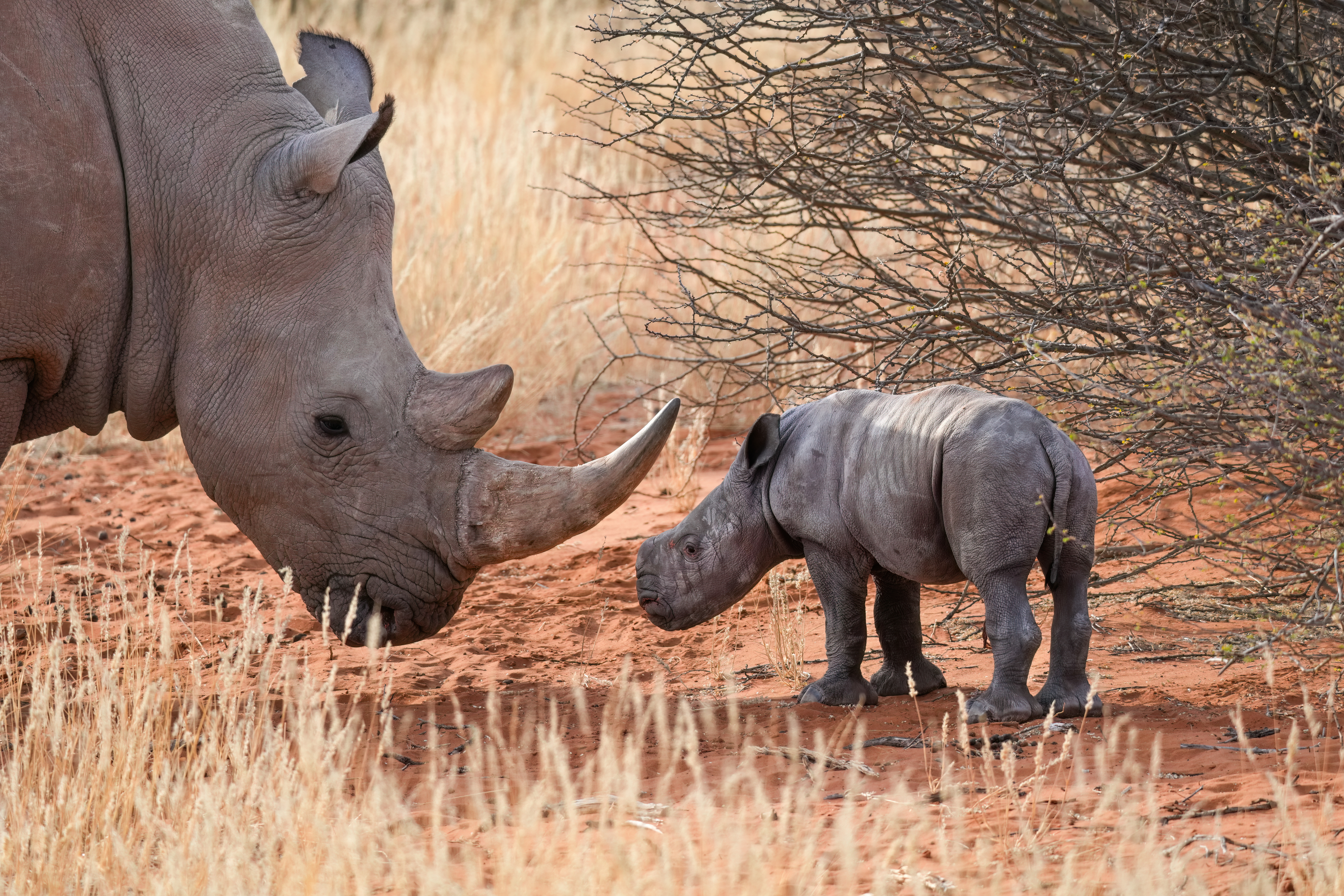
White rhinoceros mother and her newborn baby in Namibia

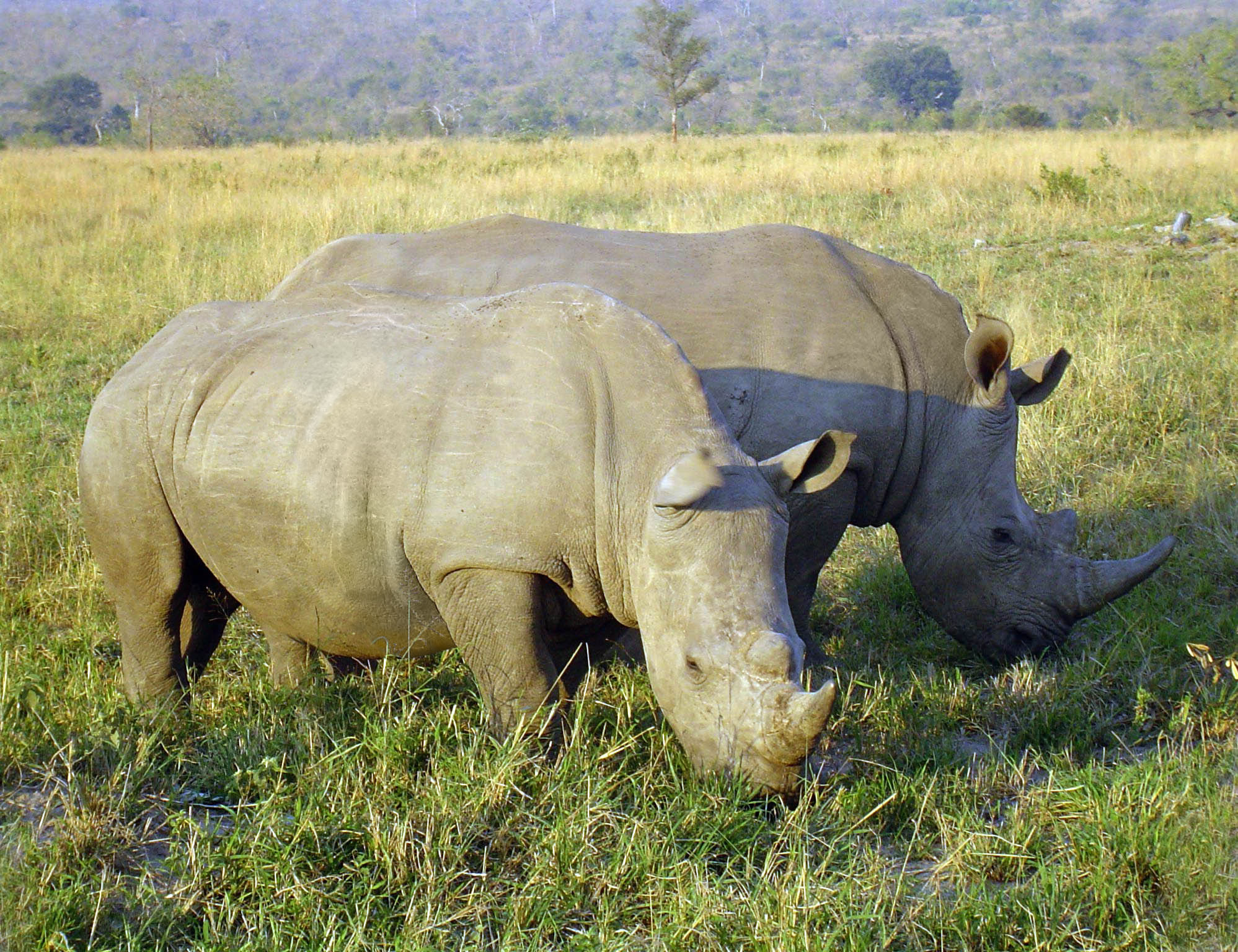
White rhinos grazing

The origin of the name "white rhinoceros" is unknown, but a popular, albeit widely discredited theory of the origins of the name "white rhinoceros" is a mistranslation from Dutch to English. The English word "white" is said to have been derived by mistranslation of the Dutch word "wijd", which means "wide" in English. The word "wide" refers to the width of the rhinoceros' mouth, distinguishing it from the narrow-lipped black rhinoceros. According to this theory, early English-speaking settlers in South Africa misinterpreted the "wijd" for "white" and the rhino with the wide mouth ended up being called the white rhino. Ironically, Dutch (and Afrikaans) later used a calque of the English word, and now also call it a white rhino (witrenoster in Afrikaans). This suggests the origin of the word was before codification by Dutch writers. A review of Dutch and Afrikaans literature about the rhinoceros has failed to produce any evidence that the word wijd was ever used to describe the rhino outside of oral use.

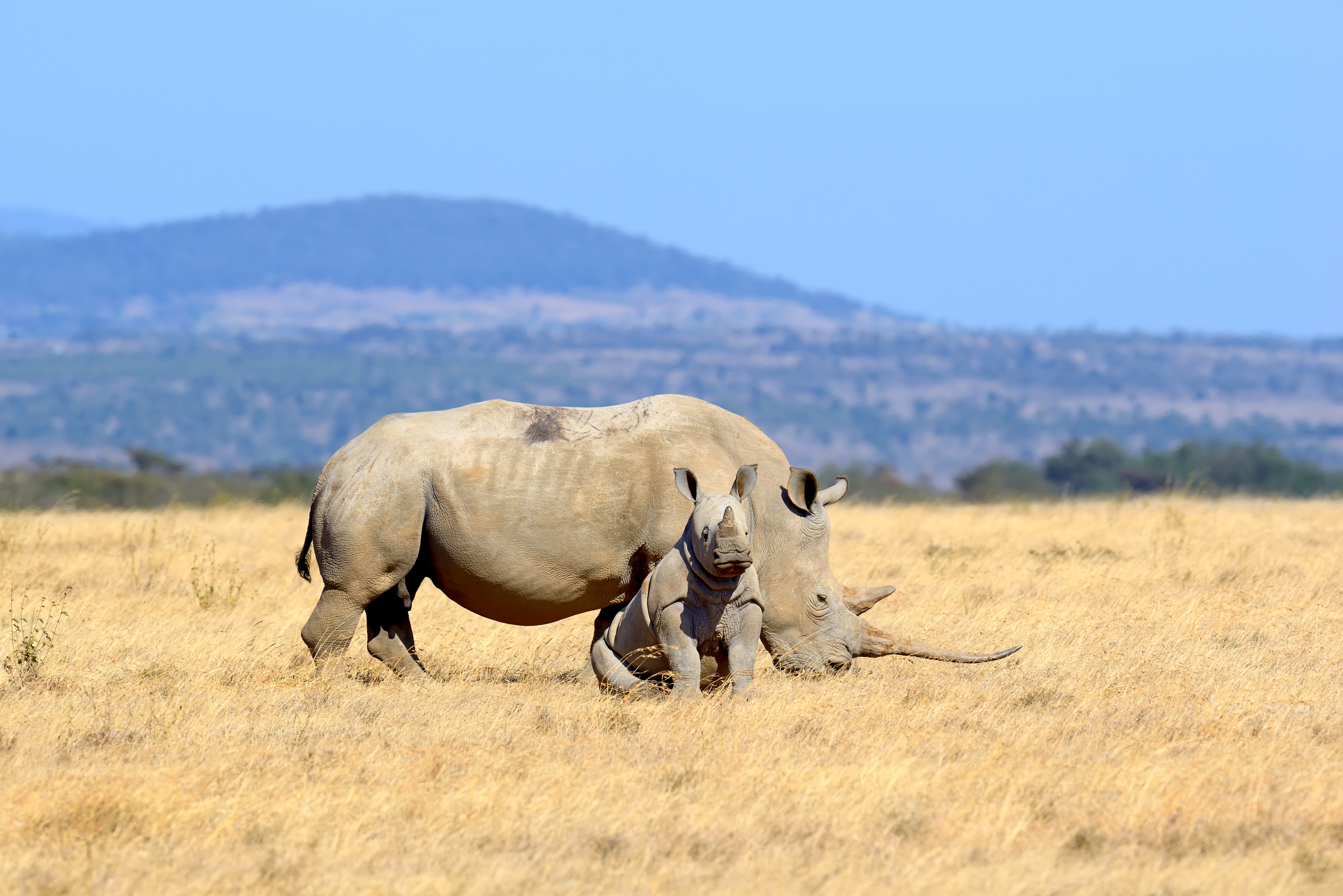
A white rhino in Solio Reserve, Kenya, clearly showing the characteristic wide lip associated with its "square-lipped" name.

An alternative name for the white rhinoceros, more accurate but rarely used, is the square-lipped rhinoceros. The white rhinoceros' generic name, Ceratotherium, given by the zoologist John Edward Gray in 1868. It derives from the Greek kéras (κέρας), meaning "horn", and thēríon (θηρίον), meaning "beast". The specific epithet, simum, comes from the Greek simos (σιμός), meaning "flat-nosed", referring to the animal's broad, flat snout.

== Taxonomy and evolution ==
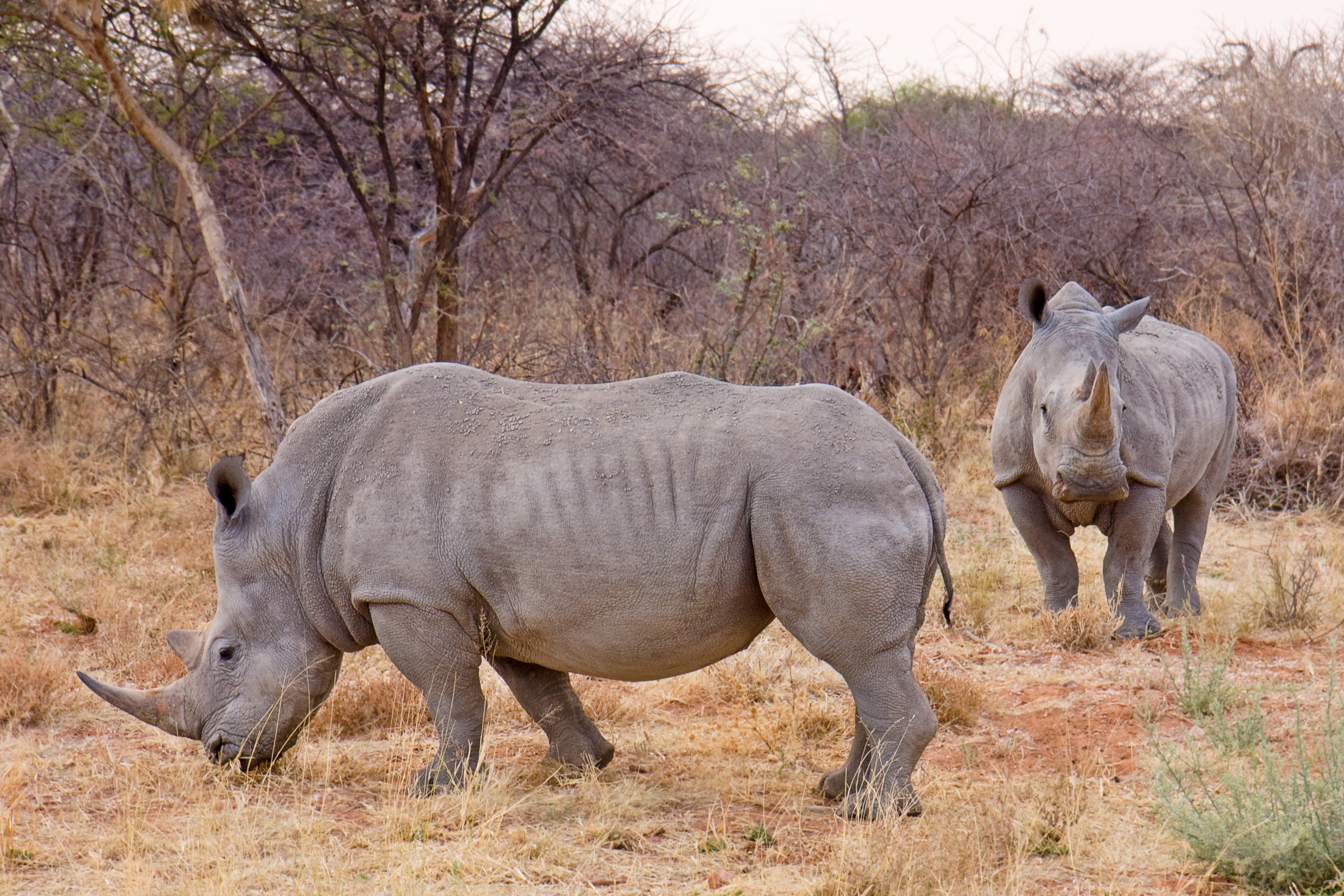
Southern white rhinos near Waterberg National Park, Namibia.

The modern white rhinoceros of today was initially thought to be descended from Ceratotherium praecox, which lived around 7 million years ago, with remains found at Langebaanweg near Cape Town. A review of fossil rhinos in Africa by Denis Geraads has suggested, however, that the species from Langebaanweg is of the genus Ceratotherium, but not Ceratotherium praecox, as the type specimen of Ceratotherium praecox should, in fact, be Diceros praecox, given that it shows closer affinities with the black rhinoceros Diceros bicornis. It has been suggested that the modern white rhino's skull, which is longer than that of Ceratotherium praecox, evolved in order to facilitate consumption of shorter grasses that resulted from the long-term trend to drier conditions in Africa. However, if Ceratotherium praecox is in fact Diceros praecox, then the shorter skull could indicate a browsing species. Teeth of fossils assigned to Ceratotherium found at Makapansgat in South Africa were analysed for carbon isotopes, and the researchers concluded that these animals consumed more than 30% browse in their diet, suggesting that these are not the fossils of the extant Ceratotherium simum, which only eats grass. It is suggested that the real lineage of the white rhino should be: Ceratotherium neumayri → Ceratotherium mauritanicum → C. simum, with the Langebaanweg rhinos being Ceratotherium sp. (as yet unnamed), and with black rhinos being descended from C. neumayri via Diceros praecox.

Recently, an alternative scenario has been proposed under which the earliest African Ceratotherium is considered to be Ceratotherium efficax (now synonymous with C. mauritanicum), known from the Late Pliocene of Ethiopia and the Early Pleistocene of Tanzania. This species is proposed to have been diversified into the Middle Pleistocene species C. mauritanicum in northern Africa, C. germanoafricanum in East Africa, and the extant C. simum. The first two of these are extinct; however, C. germanoafricanum is very similar to C. simum and has often been considered a fossil and ancestral subspecies to the latter. The study also doubts the ancestry of C. neumayri from the Miocene of southern Europe to the African species. The ancestor of both the black and the white rhino was likely a mixed feeder, with the two lineages then specializing in browsing and grazing, respectively. The oldest definitive record of the white rhinoceros is during the mid-Early Pleistocene at Olduvai Gorge in Tanzania, around 1.8 Ma.

=== Southern white rhinoceros ===
As of 2021, there were an estimated 15,940 southern white rhinos (Ceratotherium simum simum) in the wild, making them by far the most abundant subspecies of rhino in the world. The number of southern white rhinos outnumbers all other rhino subspecies combined. South Africa is the stronghold for this subspecies, with 12,968 individuals recorded in 2021. There are smaller reintroduced populations within the historical range of the species in Namibia, Botswana, Zimbabwe, Uganda and Eswatini, while a small population also surviving in Mozambique. Populations have also been introduced outside of the former range of the species to Kenya and Zambia.

=== Northern white rhinoceros ===
A northern white rhinoceros, Ceratotherium simum cottoni, translocated to Ol Pejeta Conservancy in Kenya as part of conservation efforts.

The northern white rhinoceros or northern square-lipped rhinoceros (Ceratotherium simum cottoni) is considered critically endangered and possibly extinct in the wild. Formerly found in several countries in East and Central Africa south of the Sahara, this subspecies is a grazer in grasslands and savanna woodlands.

Initially, six northern white rhinoceros lived in the Dvůr Králové Zoo in the Czech Republic. Four of the six rhinos (which were also the only reproductive animals of this subspecies) were transported to Ol Pejeta Conservancy in Kenya, where scientists hoped they would successfully breed and save this subspecies from extinction. One of the two remaining in the Czech Republic died in late May 2011. Both of the last two bulls capable of natural mating died in 2014 (one in Kenya on 18 October and one in San Diego on 15 December). In 2015, the Kenyan government placed the last remaining bull of the subspecies at Ol Pejeta under 24-hour armed guard to deter poachers, but he was put down on 19 March 2018 due to multiple health problems caused by old age, leaving just two cows alive which reside at the Ol Pejeta complex. Staff hope to inseminate the remaining cows with the last bull's semen, although the semen is not preferable due to the age of the rhino.

Following the phylogenetic species concept, recent research has led to the hypothesis that the northern white rhinoceros is a different species, rather than a subspecies of white rhinoceros as was previously thought, in which case the correct scientific name for the former should be Ceratotherium cottoni. Distinct morphological and genetic differences suggest the two proposed species have been separated for at least a million years. However, the results of the research were not universally accepted by other scientists.

== Description ==
A diagram showing the size of small and large white rhino individuals compared to humans.

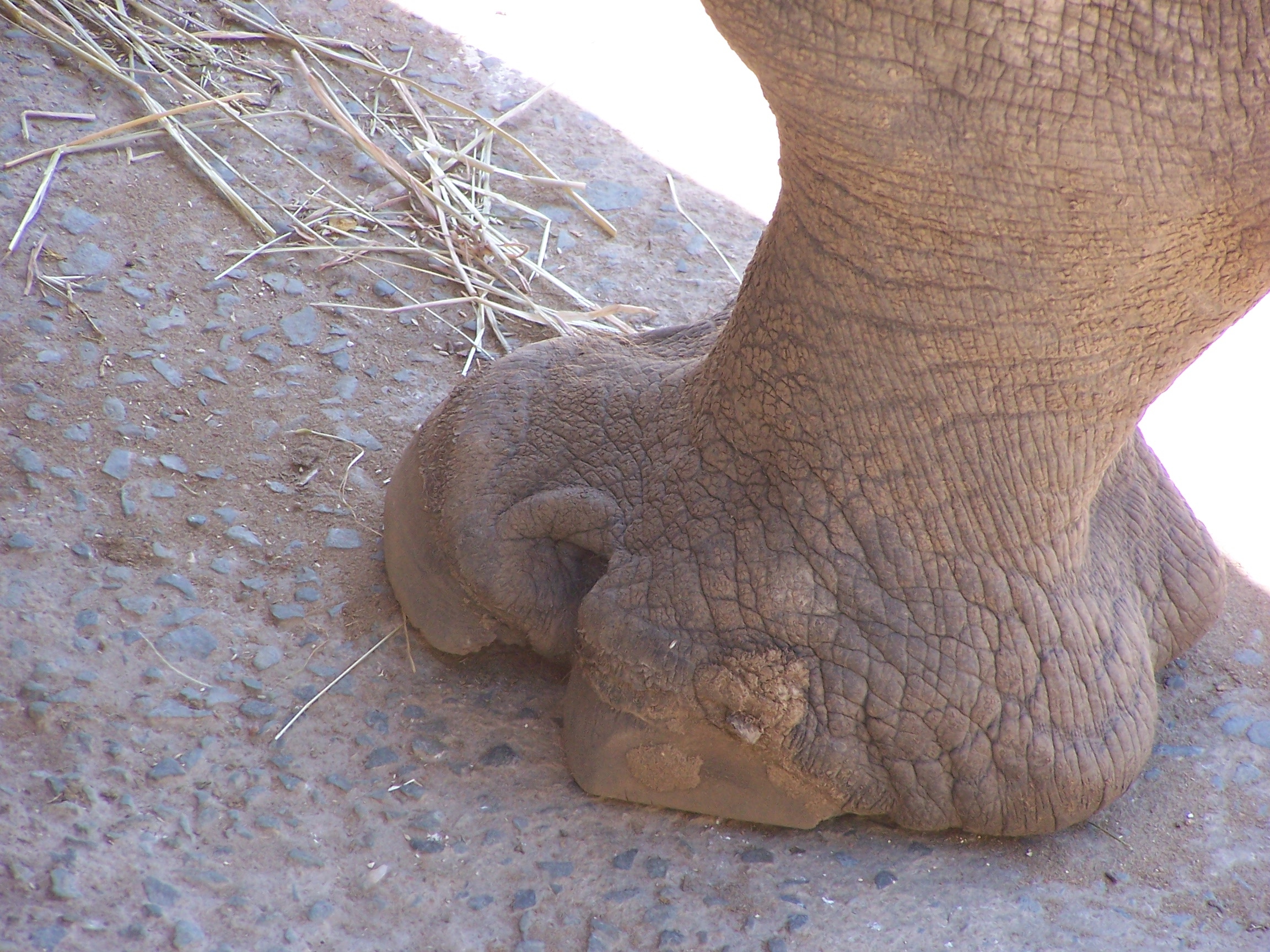
White rhino hooves have three distinct toes.

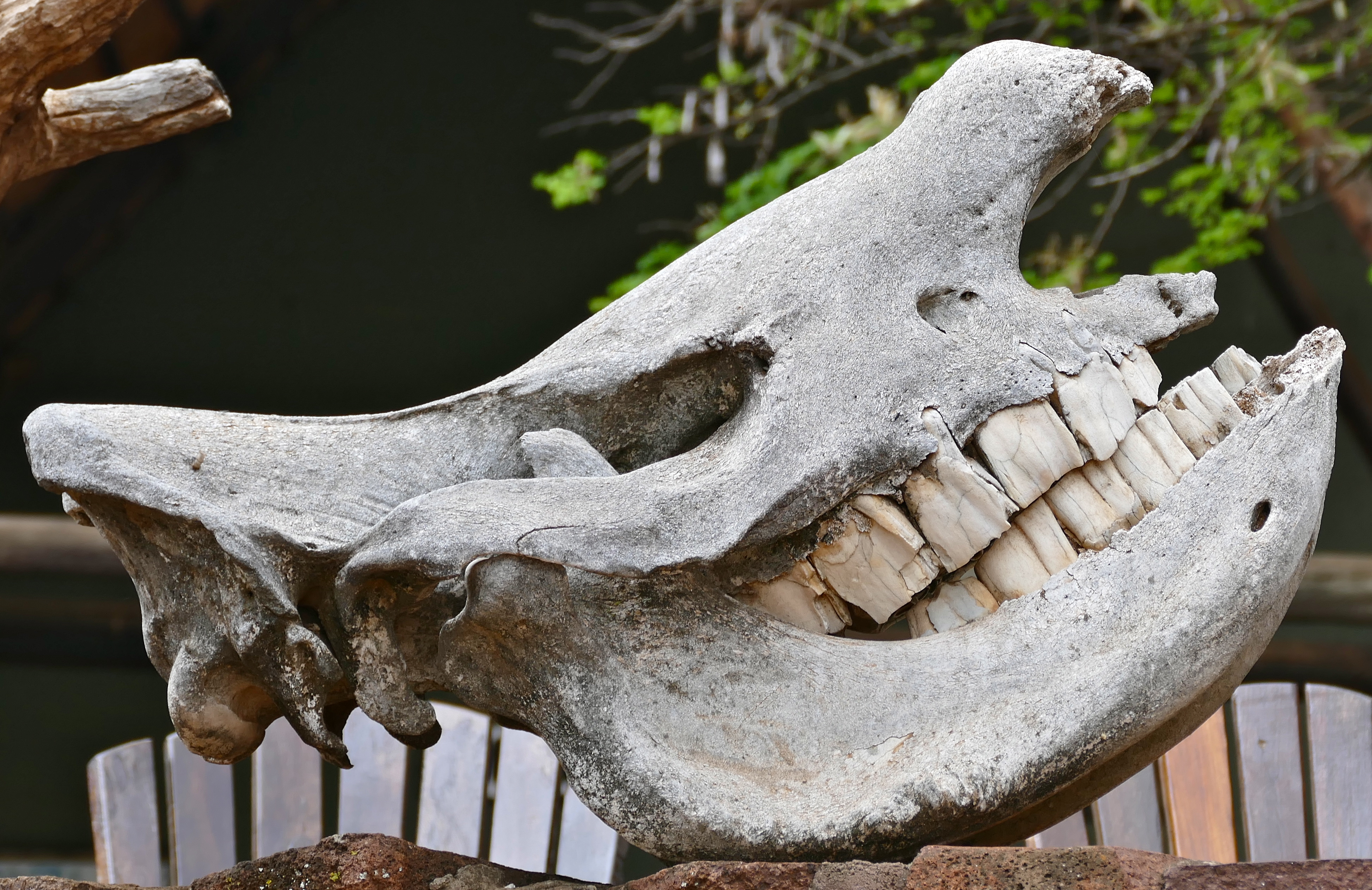
The skull

The white rhinoceros is the largest of the five living species of rhinoceros. By mean body mass, the white rhinoceros falls behind only the three extant species of elephant as the largest land animal and terrestrial mammal alive today. It weighs more on average than a hippopotamus despite a considerable mass overlap between these two species. It has a massive body and large head, a short neck and broad chest.

The head and body length is 3.7–4 m (12.1–13.1 ft) in bulls and 3.35–3.65 m (11.0–12.0 ft) in cows, with the tail adding another 70 cm (28 in), and the shoulder height is 170–186 cm (5.58–6.10 ft) in the bull and 160–177 cm (5.25–5.81 ft) in the cow. The bull, averaging about 2,000–2,300 kg (4,410–5,070 lb) is heavier than the cow, at an average of about 1,600–1,700 kg (3,530–3,750 lb). The largest size the species can attain is not definitively known; specimens of up to 3,600 kg (7,940 lb) are considered reliable, while larger sizes up to 4,500 kg (9,920 lb) have been claimed but are not verified. On its snout it has two horn-like growths, one behind the other. These are made of solid keratin, in which they differ from the horns of bovids (cattle and their relatives), which are keratin with a bony core, and deer antlers, which are solid bone. The average weight of a horn is about 4.0 kilograms (8.8 pounds).

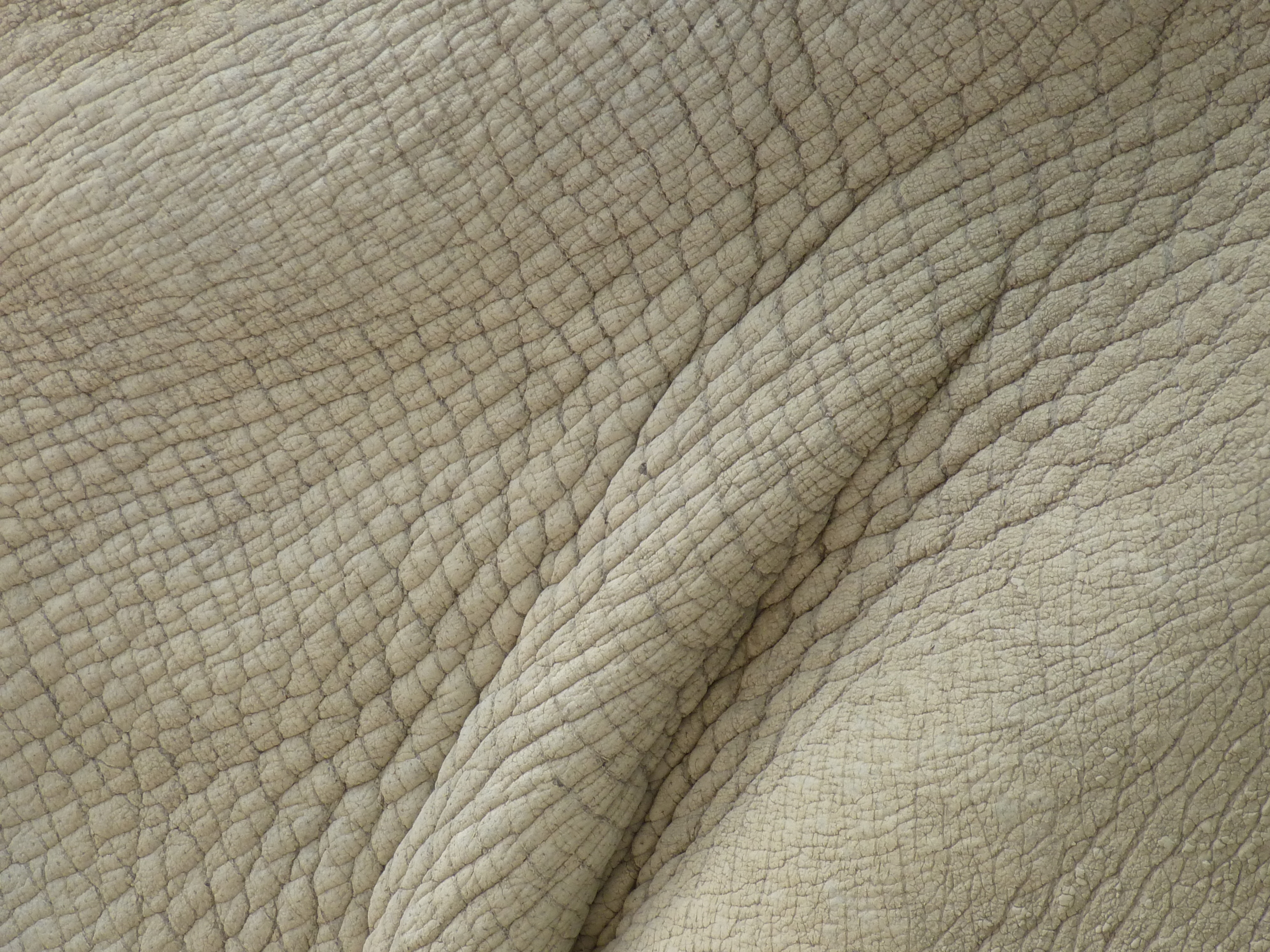
Closeup of a white rhinoceros's skin, showing its thick, folded texture, at the Lisbon Zoo.

The front horn is larger and averages 60 cm (24 in) in length, reaching as much as 166 cm (65 in) but only in cows. The white rhinoceros also has a noticeable hump on the back of its neck. Each of the four stumpy feet has three toes. The color of the body ranges from yellowish-brown to slate grey. Its only hair is the ear fringes and tail bristles. White rhinos have a distinctive broad, straight mouth which is used for grazing. Its ears can move independently to pick up sounds, but it depends most of all on its sense of smell. The olfactory passages that are responsible for smelling are larger than their entire brain. The white rhinoceros has the widest set of nostrils of any land-based animal.

== Genome ==
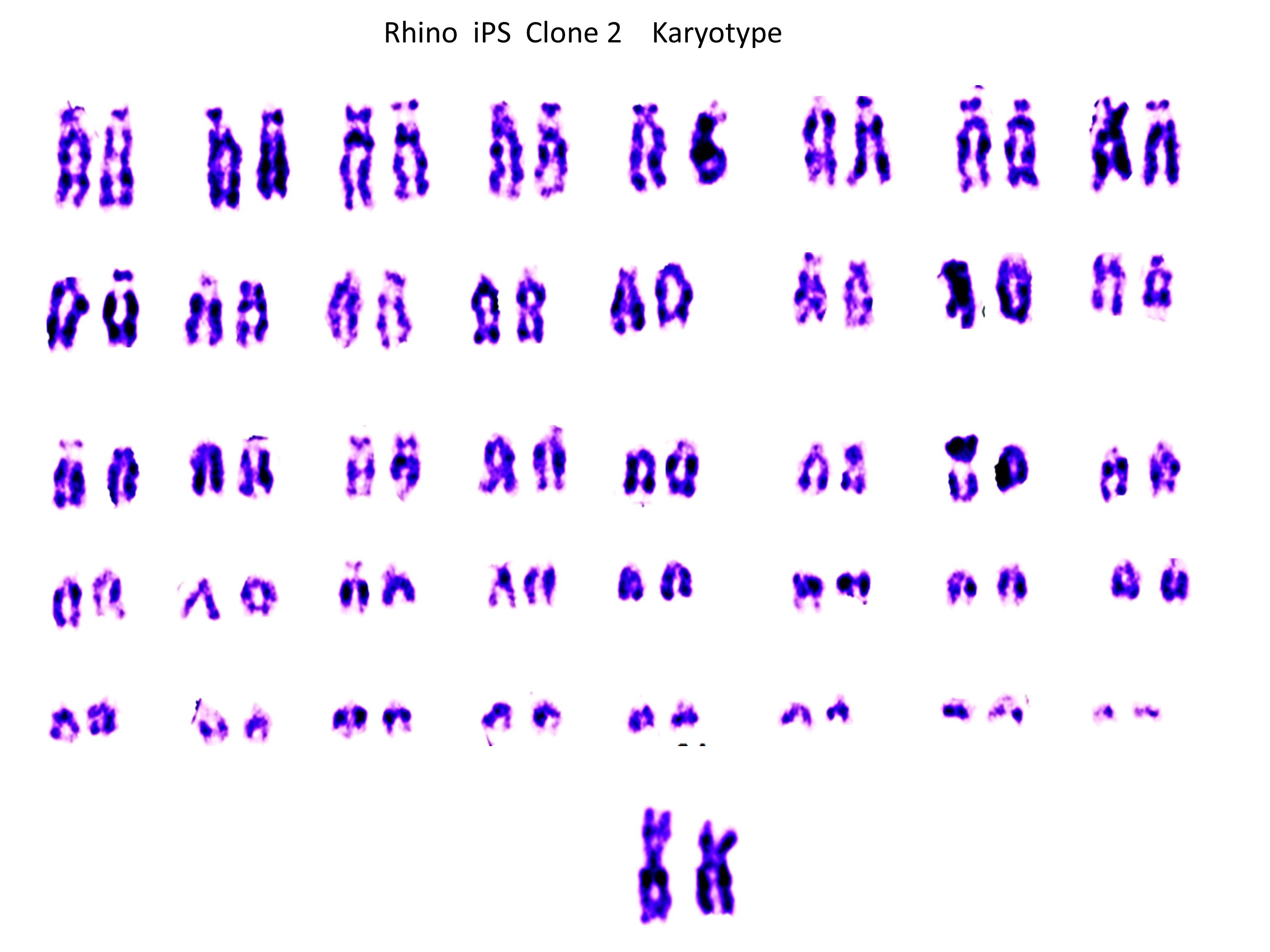
Chromosome set of a female northern white rhino. Fibroblast derived iPS cells. G-banding and giemsa staining.

The genome size of the white rhinoceros is 2581.22 Mb. A diploid cell has 2 x 40 autosomals and 2 sex chromosomes (XX or XY).

== Behavior and ecology ==
White rhinos are grazing herbivores. They are found in grassland and savannah habitat. Preferring the shortest grains, the white rhinoceros is one of the largest pure grazers. It drinks twice a day if water is available, but if conditions are dry it can live four or five days without water. It spends about half of the day eating, one-third resting, and the rest of the day doing various other things. Like all species of rhinoceros, white rhinos enjoy wallowing in mud holes to cool down. The white rhinoceros is thought to have changed the structure and ecology of the savanna's grasslands. Comparatively, based on studies of the African elephant, scientists believe the white rhino is a driving factor in its ecosystem. The destruction of the megaherbivore could have serious cascading effects on the ecosystem and harm other animals.

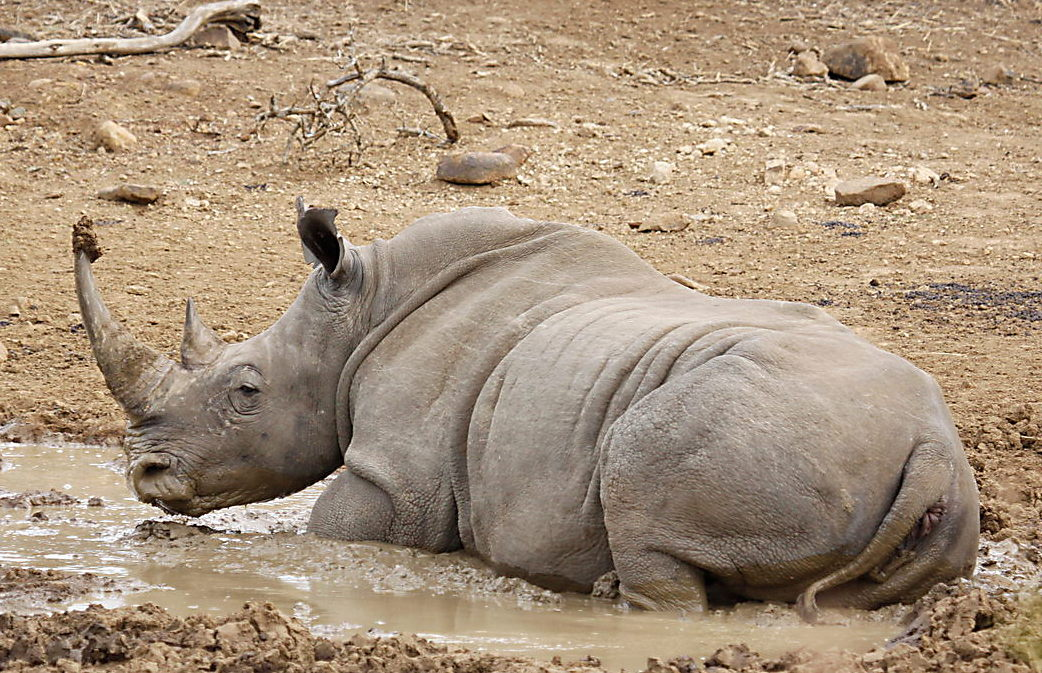
A white rhinoceros enjoying a mud wallow, essential for skin care and thermoregulation.

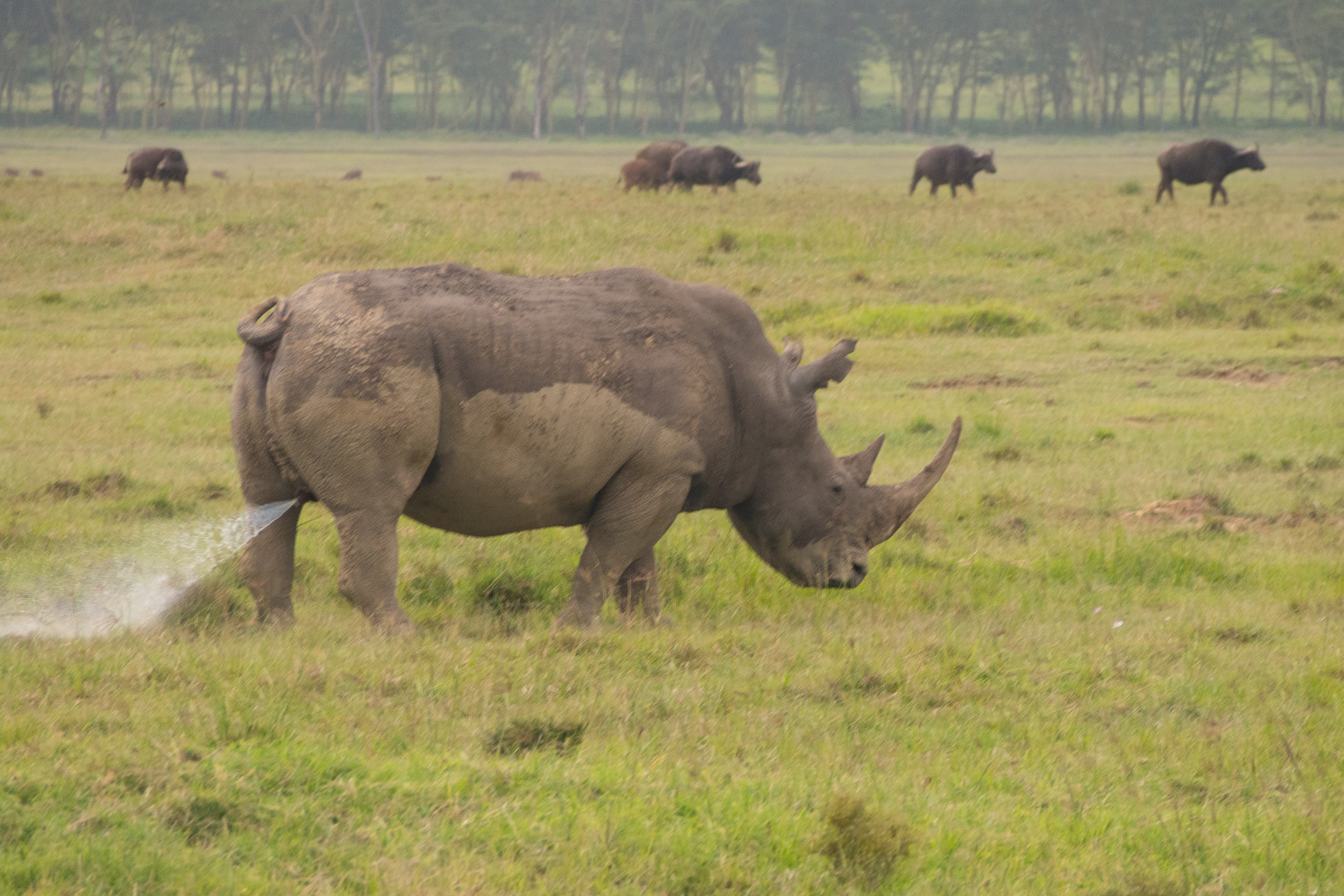
A white rhinoceros bull marking his territory with urine, a common behavior for dominant males.

White rhinos produce sounds that include a panting contact call, grunts and snorts during courtship, squeals of distress, and deep bellows or growls when threatened. Threat displays (in bulls mostly) include wiping its horn on the ground and a head-low posture with ears back, combined with snarl threats and shrieking if attacked. The vocalizations of the two species differ between each other, and the panting contact calls between individual white rhinos in each species can vary as well. The differences in these calls aid the white rhinos in identifying each other and communicating over long distances. The white rhinoceros is quick and agile and can run 50 km/h (31 mph).

White rhinos live in crashes or herds of up to 14 animals (usually mostly cows). Sub-adult bulls will congregate, often in association with an adult cow. Most adult bulls are solitary. Dominant bulls mark their territory with excrement and urine. The dung is laid in well defined piles. It may have 20 to 30 of these piles to alert passing white rhinos that it is his territory. Another way of marking their territory is wiping their horns on bushes or the ground and scraping with their feet before urine spraying. They do this around ten times an hour while patrolling territory. The same ritual as urine marking except without spraying is also commonly used. The territorial bull will scrape-mark every 30 m (100 ft) or so around his territory boundary. Subordinate bulls do not mark territory. The most serious fights break out over mating rights with a cow. Cow territory overlaps extensively, and they do not defend it.

=== Reproduction ===
Reproductive behavior and life cycle

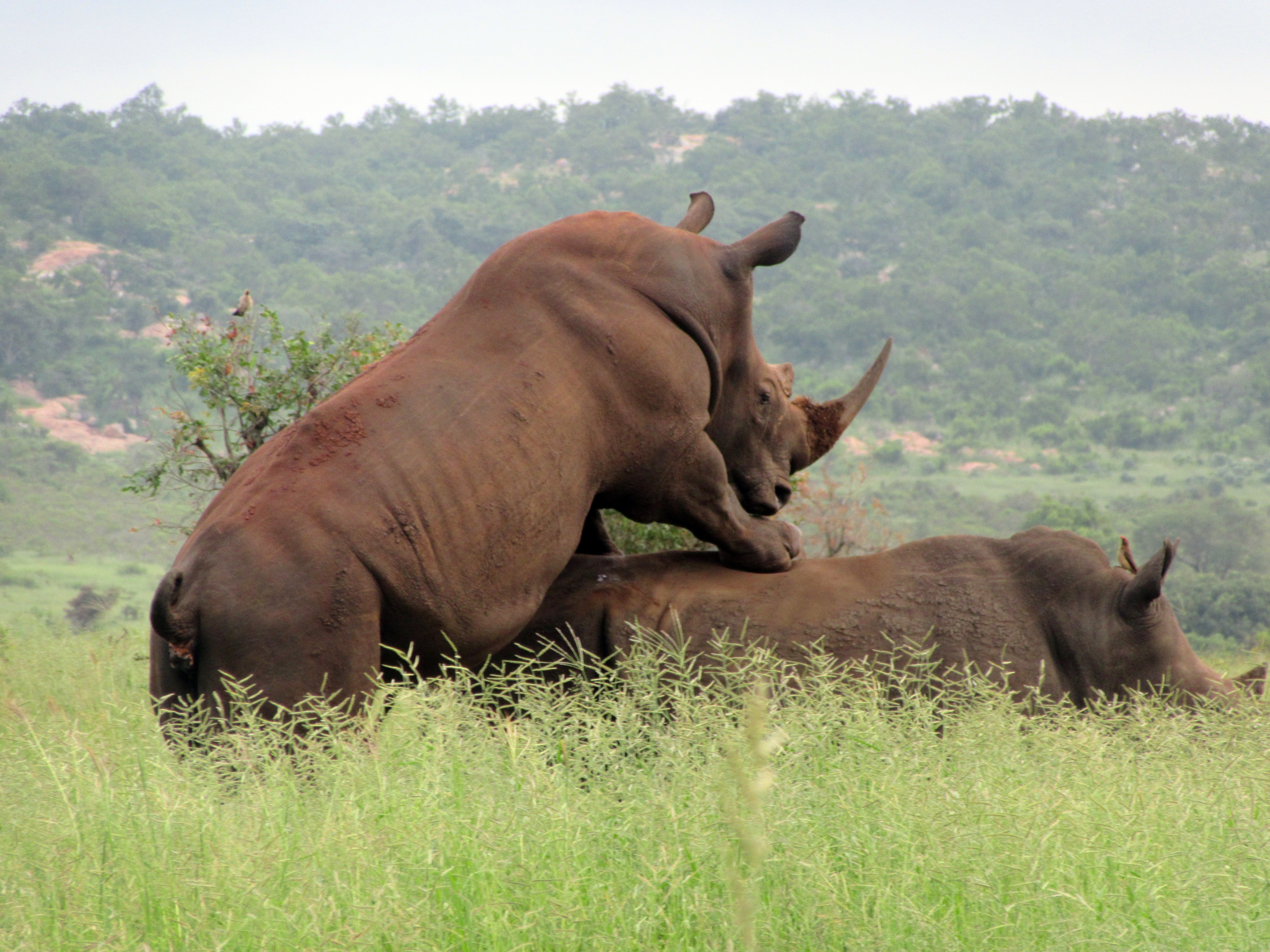
White rhinoceroses mating in Kruger National Park.

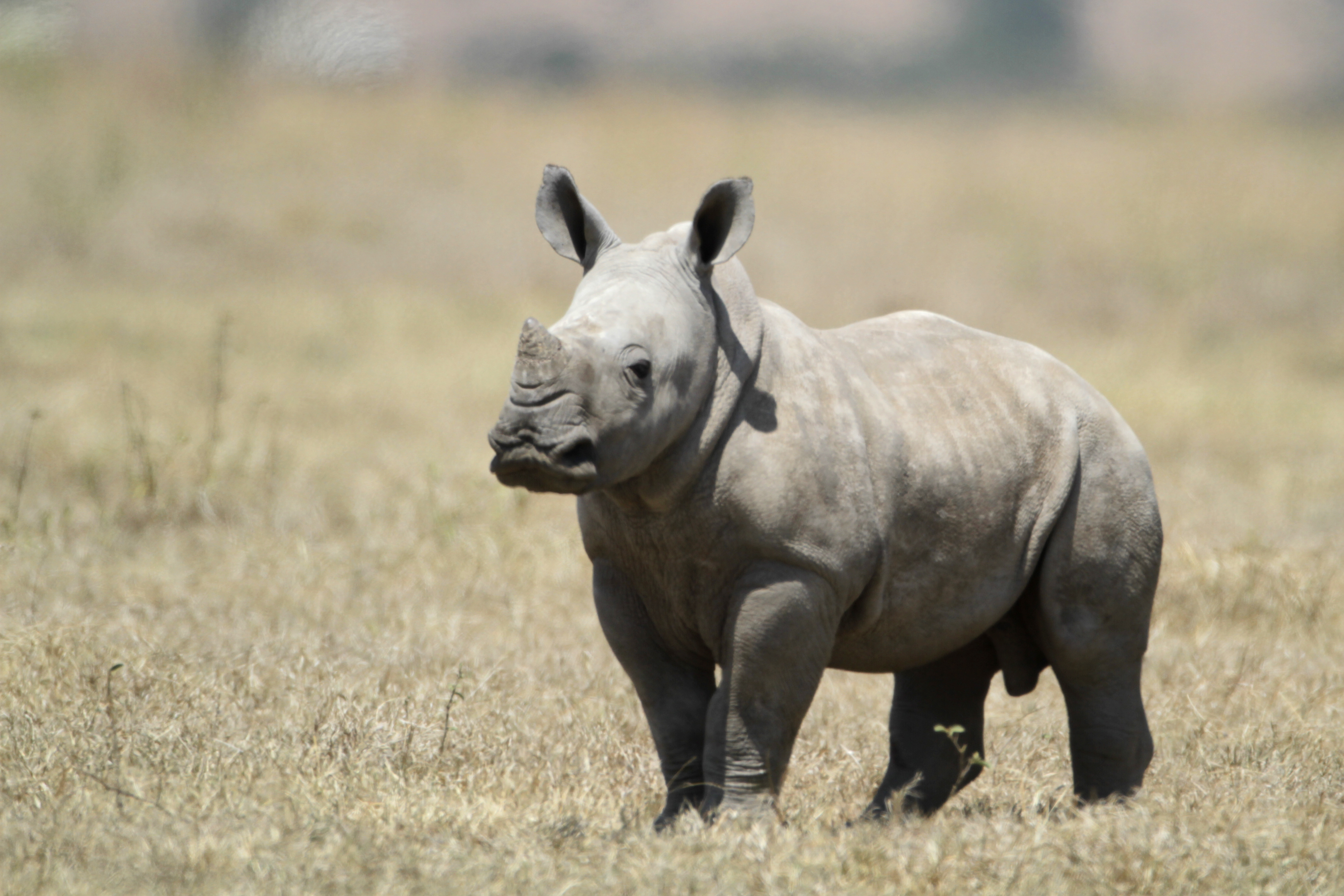
A young white rhinoceros calf, typically unsteady for the first few days.

A white rhino female with her calf grazing in Pilanesberg National Park.

Cows reach sexual maturity at 6–7 years of age while bulls reach sexual maturity between 10 and 12 years of age. Courtship is often a difficult affair. The bull stays beyond the point where the cow acts aggressively and will give out a call when approaching her. The bull chases and or blocks the way of the cow while squealing or wailing loudly if the cow tries to leave his territory. When ready to mate, the cow curls her tail and gets into a stiff stance during the half-hour copulation. Breeding pairs stay together between 5–20 days before they part their separate ways. The gestation period of a white rhino is 16 months. A single calf is born and usually weighs 40–65 kg (88–143 lb). Calves are unsteady for their first two to three days of life. When threatened, the baby will run in front of the mother, which is very protective of her calf and will fight for it vigorously. Weaning starts at two months, but the calf may continue suckling for over 12 months. The birth interval for the white rhino is between two and three years. Before giving birth, the mother will chase off her current calf. White rhinos can live to be up to 40–50 years old.

Due to their size, adult white rhinos have no natural predators (other than humans), and even young rhinos are rarely attacked or preyed on due to the mother's presence and their tough skin. One exceptional, successful attack was perpetrated by a lion pride on a sick bull white rhinoceros, which weighed 1,540 kg (3,400 lb), and occurred in Mala Mala Game Reserve, South Africa.

== Distribution ==
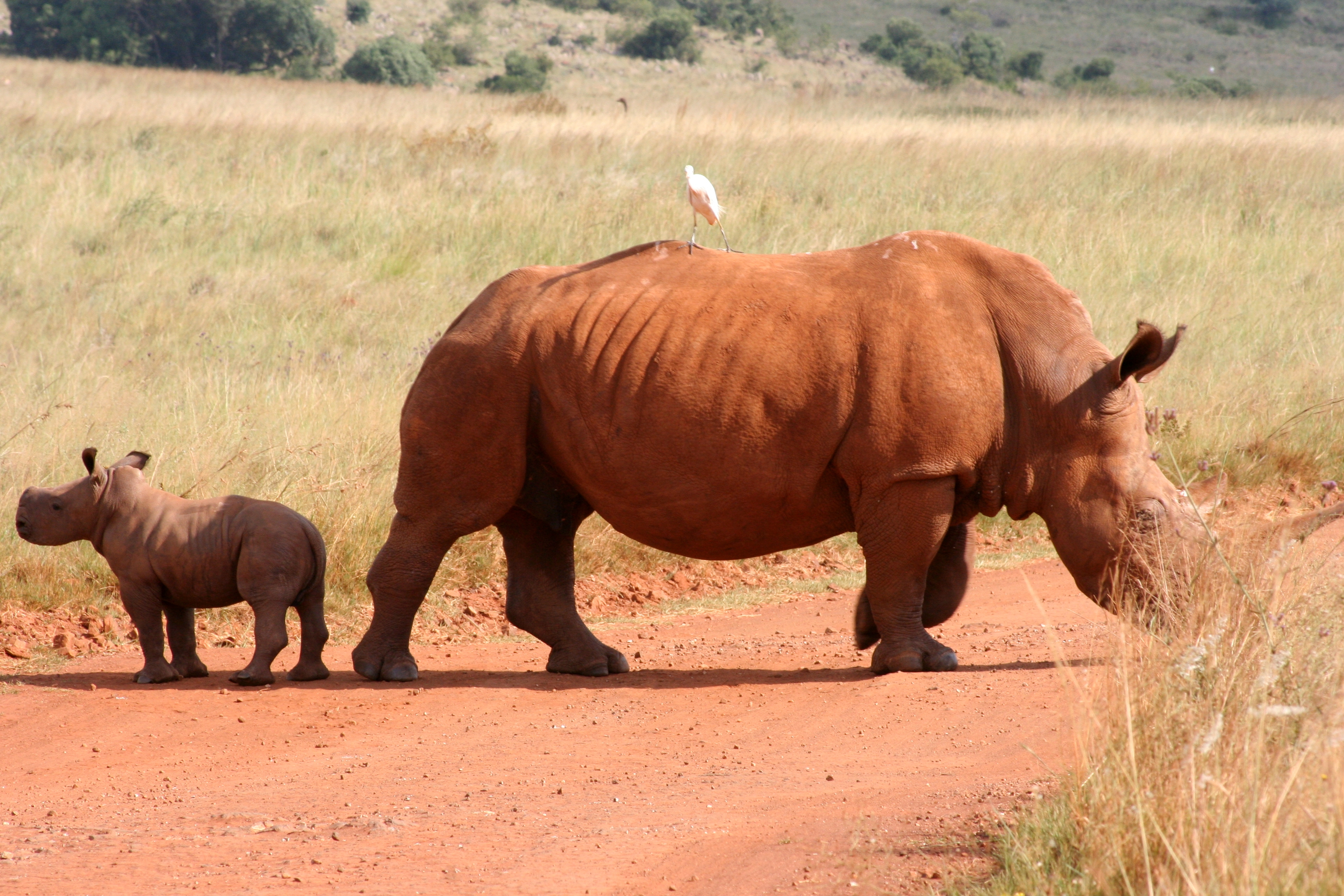
A southern white rhino mother and calf at the Rhino and Lion Nature Reserve, Johannesburg.

The southern white rhino lives in Southern Africa. About 98.5% of white rhinos live in just five countries (South Africa, Namibia, Zimbabwe, Kenya, and Uganda). Almost at the edge of extinction in the early 20th century, the southern subspecies have made a tremendous comeback. In 2001, it was estimated that there were 11,670 white rhinos in the wild, with a further 777 in captivity worldwide, making it the most common rhino in the world. By the end of 2007, wild-living southern white rhinos had increased to an estimated 17,480 animals (IUCN 2008).

The northern white rhino (Ceratotherium simum cottoni) formerly ranged over parts of northwestern Uganda, southern Chad, southwestern Sudan, the eastern part of Central African Republic, and northeastern Democratic Republic of the Congo (DRC). The last surviving population of wild northern white rhinos are or were in Garamba National Park, Democratic Republic of the Congo (DRC) but in August 2005, ground and aerial surveys conducted under the direction of African Parks Foundation and the African Rhino Specialist Group (ARSG) only found four animals: a solitary adult male and a group of one adult male and two adult females. In June 2008, it was reported that the species may have gone extinct in the wild.

Like the black rhino, the white rhino is under threat from habitat loss and poaching, most recently by Janjaweed. Although there are no measurable health benefits, the horn is sought after for traditional medicine and jewelry.

== Poaching ==
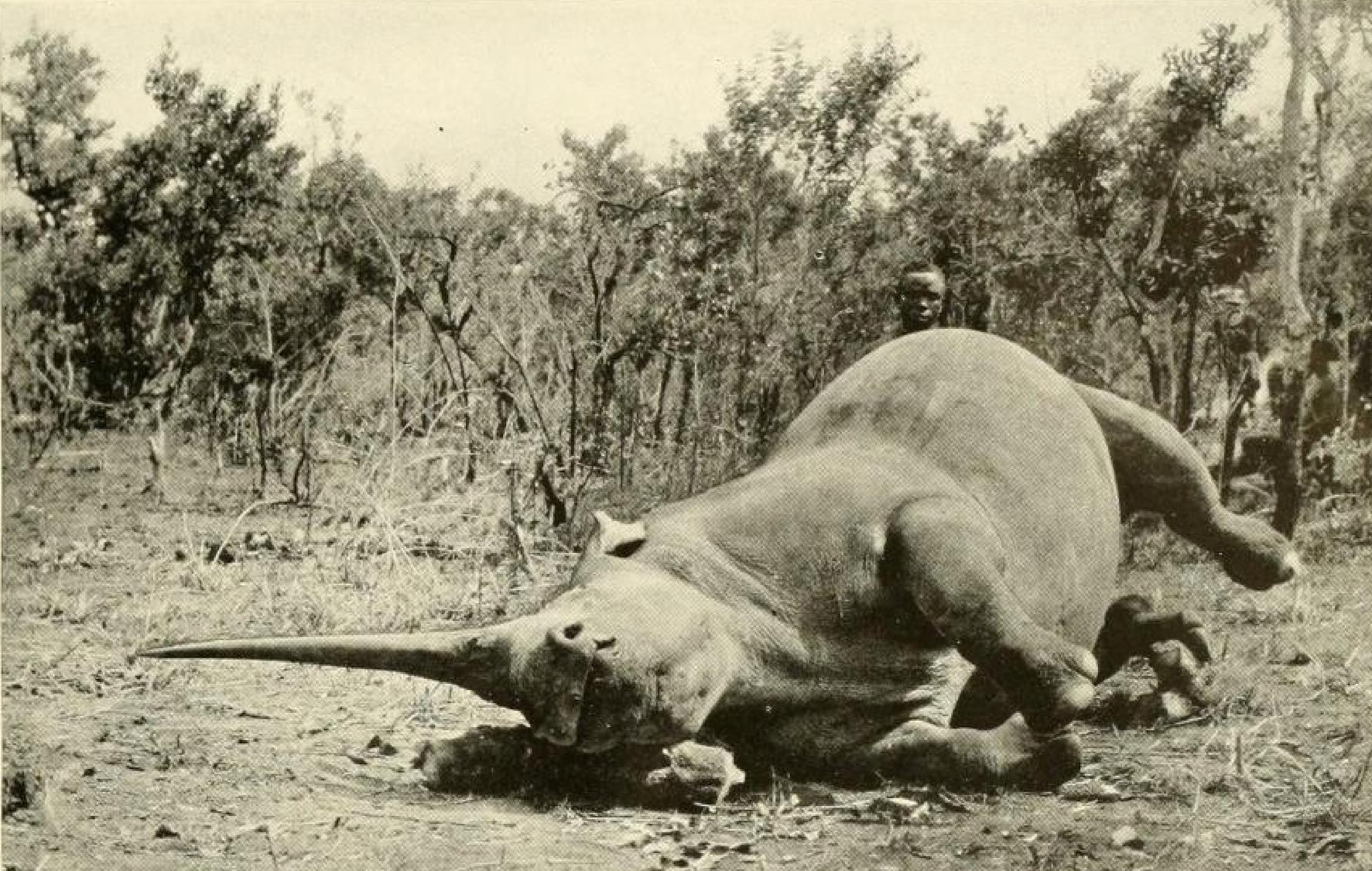
A female northern white rhino shot in the early 20th century

Historically, the major factor in the decline of white rhinos was uncontrolled hunting in the colonial era, but now poaching for their horn is the primary threat. The white rhino is particularly vulnerable to hunting because it is a large and relatively unaggressive animal with very poor eyesight and generally living in herds.

Despite the lack of scientific evidence, the rhino horn is highly prized in traditional Asian medicine, where it is ground into a fine powder or manufactured into tablets to be used as a treatment for a variety of illnesses such as nosebleeds, strokes, convulsions, and fevers. Due to this demand, several highly organized and very profitable international poaching syndicates came into being and would carry out their poaching missions with advanced technologies ranging from night vision scopes, silenced weapons, darting equipment, and even helicopters. The ongoing conflict in the Democratic Republic of Congo and incursions by poachers, primarily coming from Sudan, have further disrupted efforts to protect the few remaining northern rhinos.

In 2013, poaching rates for white rhinos nearly doubled from the previous year. As a result, the white rhino has now received Near Threatened status as its total population tops out at 20,000 members. Poaching of the animal has gone virtually unchecked in most of Africa, and the non-violent nature of the rhinoceros makes it susceptible to poaching. Mozambique, one of the four main countries in which the white rhino lives, is used by poachers as a passageway to South Africa, which holds a fairly large number of white rhinos. Here, rhinos are regularly killed and their horns are smuggled out of the country. As of 2014, Mozambique labels white rhino poaching as a misdemeanor. The white rhino population in South Africa's Kruger National Park fell by 60% between 2013 and 2021, to an estimated 3,529 individuals.

In March 2017, poachers broke into the Thoiry Zoo, which is located in France. A southern white rhinoceros named Vince was found shot dead in his enclosure; the poachers had removed one of his horns and had attempted to remove his second horn. This is believed to be the first time that a rhinoceros had been killed in a European zoo.

Even with increased anti-poaching efforts in many African countries, many poachers are still willing to risk death or prison time because of the tremendous amount of money that they stand to make. Rhino horn can fetch tens of thousands of dollars per kilogram on the black market in Asia, and, depending on the exact price, can be worth more than its weight in gold. Poachers are also starting to use social media sites for obtaining information on the location of rhino in popular tourist attractions (such as Kruger National Park) by searching for geotagged photographs posted online by unsuspecting tourists. By using GPS coordinates of rhinos in recent photographs, poachers can more easily find and kill their targets.

== Modern conservation tactics ==
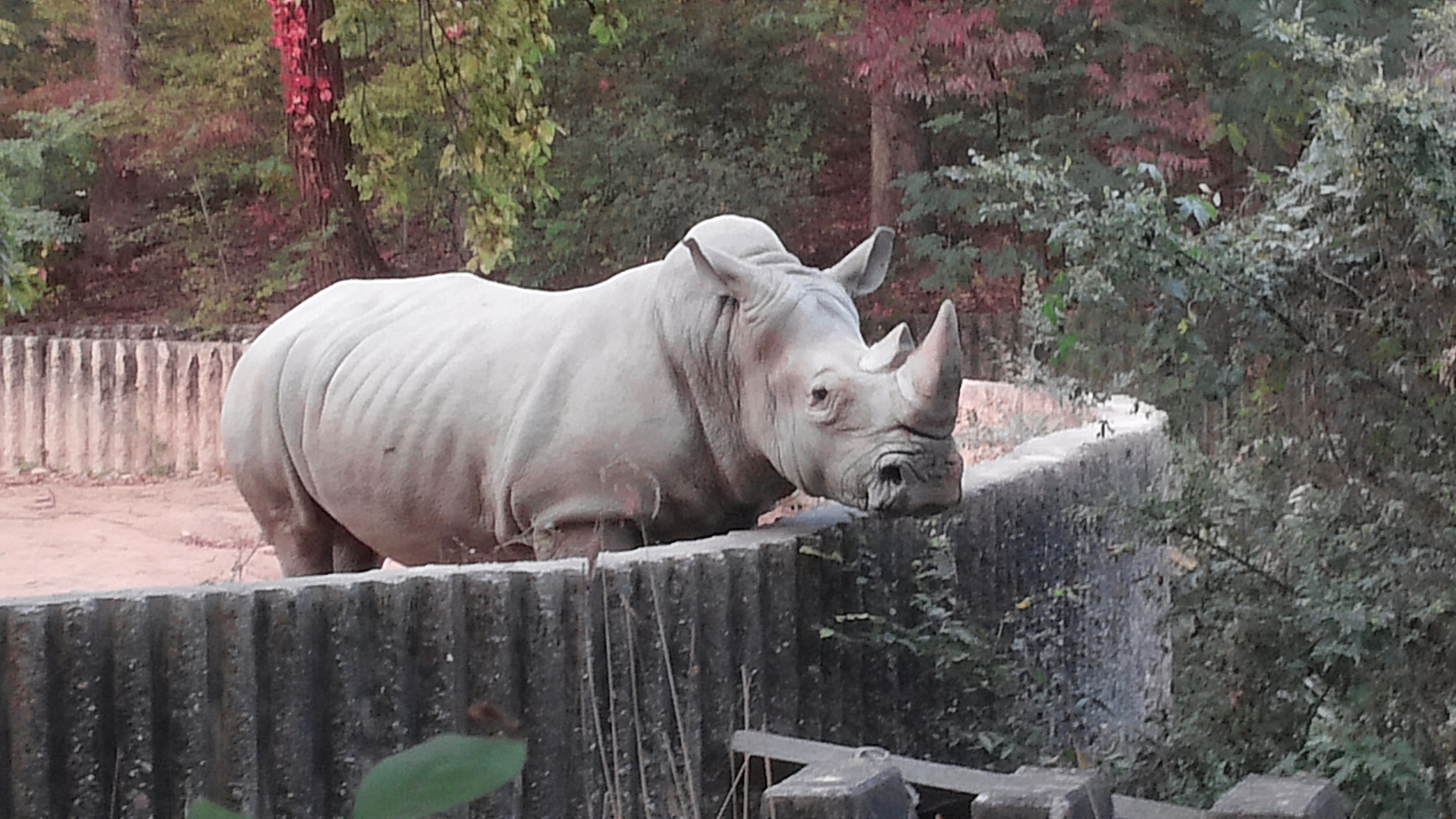
White rhinoceros at Seoul Grand Park in Gwacheon, South Korea

The northern white rhino is critically endangered to the point that only two of these rhinos are known to remain in the world, both in captivity. Several conservation tactics have been taken to prevent this subspecies from disappearing from the planet. Perhaps the most notable type of conservation effort for these rhinos is having moved them from Dvur Kralove Zoo in the Czech Republic to Kenya's Ol Pejeta Conservancy on 20 December 2009, where they have been under constant watch every day, and have been given favorable climate and diet, to which they have adapted well, to boost their chances of reproducing.

To save the northern white rhino from extinction, Ol Pejeta Conservancy announced that it would introduce a fertile male southern white rhino from Lewa Wildlife Conservancy in February 2014. They placed the male rhino in an enclosure with both female northern white rhinos in hopes to cross-breed the subspecies. Having the male rhino with two female rhinos was expected to increase competition for the female rhinos and, in theory, should result in more mating experiences. However, Ol Pejeta Conservancy did not report any reported pregnancies or successful inter-subspecies matings.

On 22 August 2019, using (ICSI), eggs from Fatu and Najin "were successfully inseminated" using the seminal fluid from Saut and Suni. The male Sudan's sperm was harvested before his death and is still in Kenya. On 11 September 2019, it was announced that "two embryos" were generated and will be kept in a frozen state, until placed in a surrogate female. On 15 January 2020, it was announced that "another embryo" was created using the same techniques; all three embryos are "from Fatu".

== In captivity ==
A pair of southern white rhinos at the Tobu Zoo in Saitama, Japan.

All white rhinos in zoos and wildlife parks globally are southern white rhinos; in 2021, their worldwide captive population was estimated to be over 1,000 individuals. Wild-caught southern whites will readily breed in captivity given appropriate amounts of space and food, as well as the presence of other female rhinos of breeding age. However, for reasons that are not currently understood, the rate of reproduction is extremely low among captive-born southern white females.

The San Diego Zoo Safari Park in California, United States, played a role in attempting to conserve the northern white rhino. The park housed two northern white rhinos: Angalifu, a wild-caught male who died of old age on 14 December 2014, and Nola, a female born in 1974, who had been on loan from the Dvůr Králové Zoo in the Czech Republic since 1989. She was euthanized on 22 November 2015, due to declining health. The other four captive northern white rhinos were loaned to Ol Pejeta Conservancy in Kenya, and only two remain alive. Females Najin and Fatu are still living, while males Suni and Sudan died in 2014 and 2018, respectively. The northern white rhinos had been transferred to Ol Pejeta Conservancy from the Dvůr Králové Zoo in 2009 in an attempt to protect the taxa in their natural habitat. The only two northern white rhinos left are maintained under 24-hour armed guard in Kenya.
