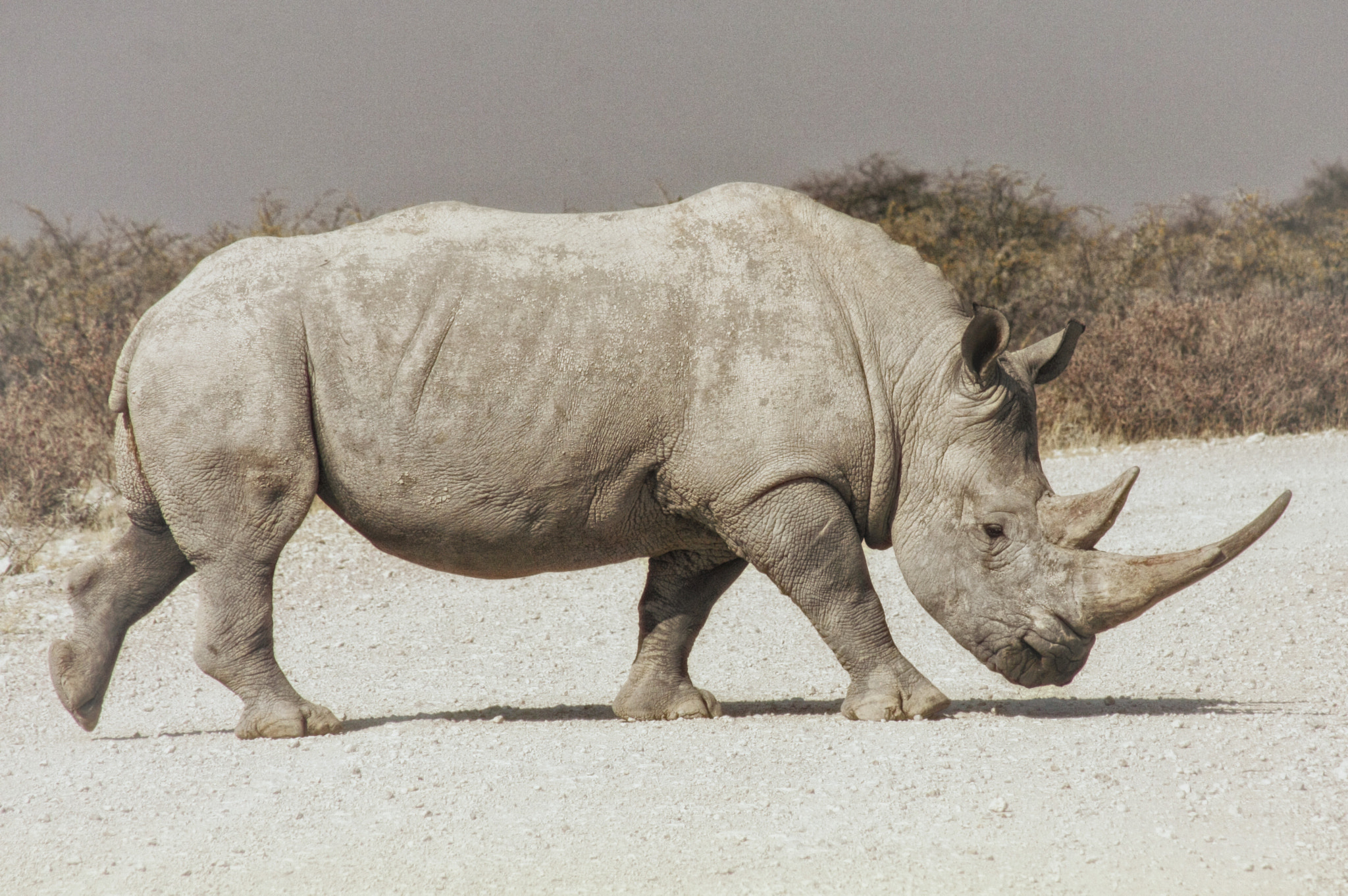
- A white rhinoceros (Ceratotherium simum) in Etosha National Park, Namibia

Scientific classification
- Kingdom: Animalia
- Phylum: Chordata
- Class: Mammalia
- Infraclass: Placentalia
- Order: Perissodactyla
- Family: Rhinocerotidae
- Tribe: Dicerotini
- Genus: Ceratotherium; Gray, 1868

Species
- †C. mauritanicum; †C. neumayri?; C. simum; For others, see text

= Ceratotherium =

Ceratotherium Temporal range: Tortonian − Recent

Genus of mammals

Ceratotherium (Greek: "horn" (keratos), "beast" (therion)) is a genus of the family Rhinocerotidae, consisting of a single extant species, the white rhinoceros (Ceratotherium simum), as well as several fossil species.

== Taxonomy ==
Ceratotherium is more closely related to the genus Diceros (which contains the black rhinoceros) than it is to other living rhinoceroses, with the clade containing the two comprising the tribe Dicerotini (also spelled Diceroti) or subtribe Dicerotina.

An extinct relative, Ceratotherium mauritanicum, is known from the Pleistocene of North Africa and possibly the Pliocene of East Africa. Some authors have alternatively assigned the Pliocene East African remains to the species Ceratotherium efficax. Some authors have considered Ceratotherium mauritanicum to be the ancestor of the living white rhinoceros if the Pliocene East African material is included, though others who only include North African material have suggested that it instead represents a distinct offshoot not ancestral to the white rhinoceros.

Another species known as Ceratotherium praecox with remains assigned to the species dating to the Late Miocene and Pliocene (around 7-3 million years ago) of East Africa is now considered a member of the related genus Diceros because of the type material probably belongs to this genus, though other material historically assigned to this species likely represents true Ceratotherium. The placement of "Ceratotherium" neumayri from the Late Miocene of Europe and Western Asia within the genus has been questioned, with it possibly more closely related to the black rhinoceros or ancestral to both the white and black rhinoceros, or an early offshoot away from these two species, with other authors assigning it to Diceros or to the monotypic genus Miodiceros. Some authors have recognised the species Ceratotherium germanoafricanum for remains spanning around 3-1 million years ago in East Africa and suggest that this species may be ancestral to the living white rhinoceros, though other authors have considered it a subspecies of the white rhinoceros or assigned these remains to other species like C. mauritanicum.

The species "Ceratotherium" advenientis is known from the Late Miocene of southern Italy (when it was still part of Africa). The species "Ceratotherium" douariense, known from the late Miocene of Tunisia, dating to around 7 million years ago, has been assigned to the genus by some authors. Its genus placement is disputed, with other authors placing the species in the genus Diceros as Diceros douariensis. The species Ceratotherium? primaevum has been reported from Algeria dating to around 10 million years ago, with other possible remains reported from East Africa (Ethiopia, Kenya).

The earliest remains of the white rhinoceros date to the Early Pleistocene in East Africa, around 1-2 million years ago, depending on what remains are included in the species.
