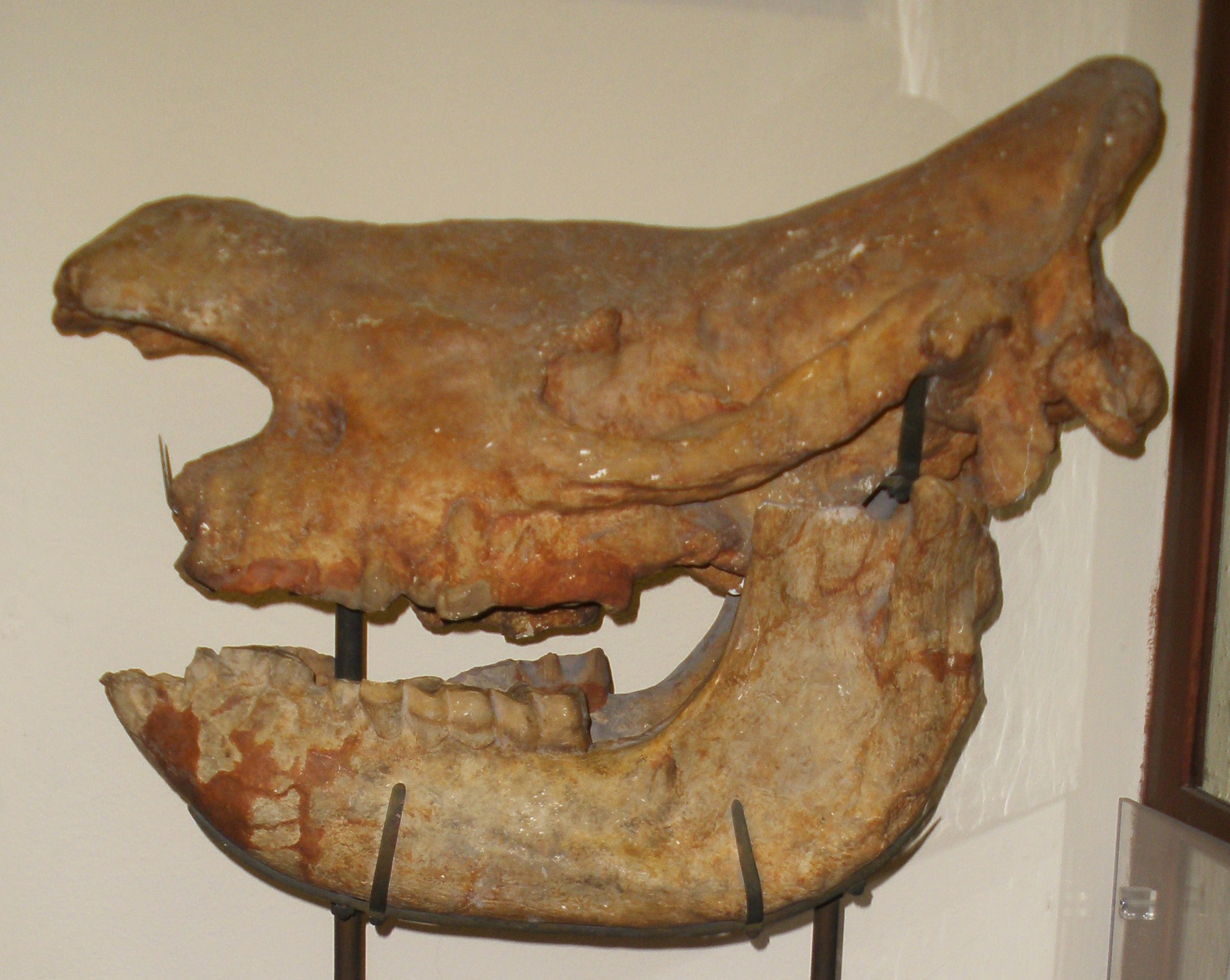
- Skull

Scientific classification
- Kingdom: Animalia
- Phylum: Chordata
- Class: Mammalia
- Infraclass: Placentalia
- Order: Perissodactyla
- Family: Rhinocerotidae
- Genus: Ceratotherium
- Species: †C. neumayri

Binomial name
- †Ceratotherium neumayri (Osborn, 1900)

Synonyms
- Atelodus neumayri Osborn, 1900 (basionym); Diceros pachygnathus Guérin, 1980; Diceros neumayri (Osborn, 1900); Miodiceros neumayri (Osborn, 1900) Giaourtsakis 2022 gen. nov.

= Ceratotherium neumayri =

Ceratotherium neumayri Temporal range: Late Miocene, Vallesian-Turolian

Extinct species of rhinoceros

Ceratotherium neumayri (also known by several other names) is an extinct species of rhinoceros from the Late Miocene epoch (specifically the Vallesian and Turolian European land mammal ages) of the Balkans (including Greece and Bulgaria) and Western Asia (including Iran and Anatolia in Turkey).

== Taxonomy ==
The species was originally named Atelodus neumayri by Henry Fairfield Osborn in 1900. It is considered part of the tribe Dicerotini (also spelled Diceroti) or subtribe Dicerotina, indicating a close relationship to the extant African rhinoceroses, the black rhinoceros (Diceros bicornis) and the white rhinoceros (Ceratotherium simum).

The generic assignment of C. neumayri is disputed, having been placed in both Ceratotherium and Diceros by various authors. Some paleontologists have proposed it as a common ancestor to both Ceratotherium and Diceros, while others suggest it represents an early, distinct evolutionary branch not directly ancestral to the modern African rhinos. A 2022 study placed the species in the separate monotypic genus Miodiceros, however, a comprehensive 2025 phylogenetic analysis found it to be a true species of the genus Ceratotherium.

== Description ==
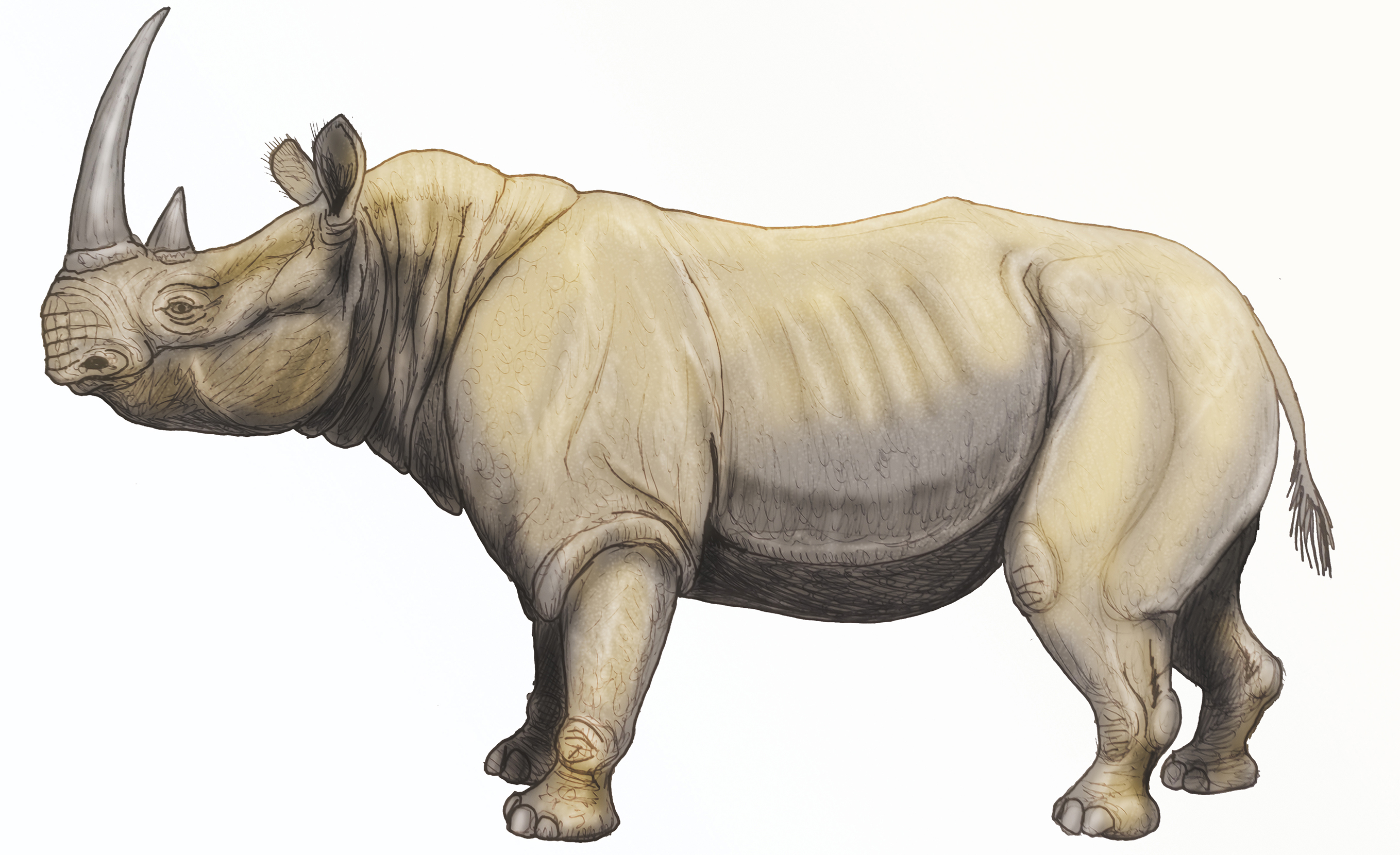
Life restoration

The species was a large sized rhinoceros, and had two horns, a nasal and a frontal horn. The nasal septum was not ossified.

== Ecology ==
Analysis of dental microwear patterns on the teeth of C. neumayri suggests that it was a mixed feeder. This diet means it was adaptable, both grazing on grasses and browsing on leaves and twigs from shrubs and trees.

== Discoveries ==
Fossils attributed to C. neumayri have been found across southeastern Europe and Western Asia. Fossils of the species have been found in the Balkans, including Bulgaria and Greece (such as Pikermi, Samos, and Axios Valley). Discoveries also extend into Anatolia and northern Iran, with occurrences in the southern Caucasus.

In 2012, a well-preserved skull from Gülşehir, dating to around 9.2 million years ago was found. This individual is believed to have died due to extreme temperatures from a pyroclastic flow (ignimbrite) associated with a volcanic eruption.

Some authors have suggested that the species was also present in Africa, based on Late Miocene remains found in Tunisia originally attributed to C. douariense.
