= List of perissodactyls =

Species in mammal order Perissodactyla

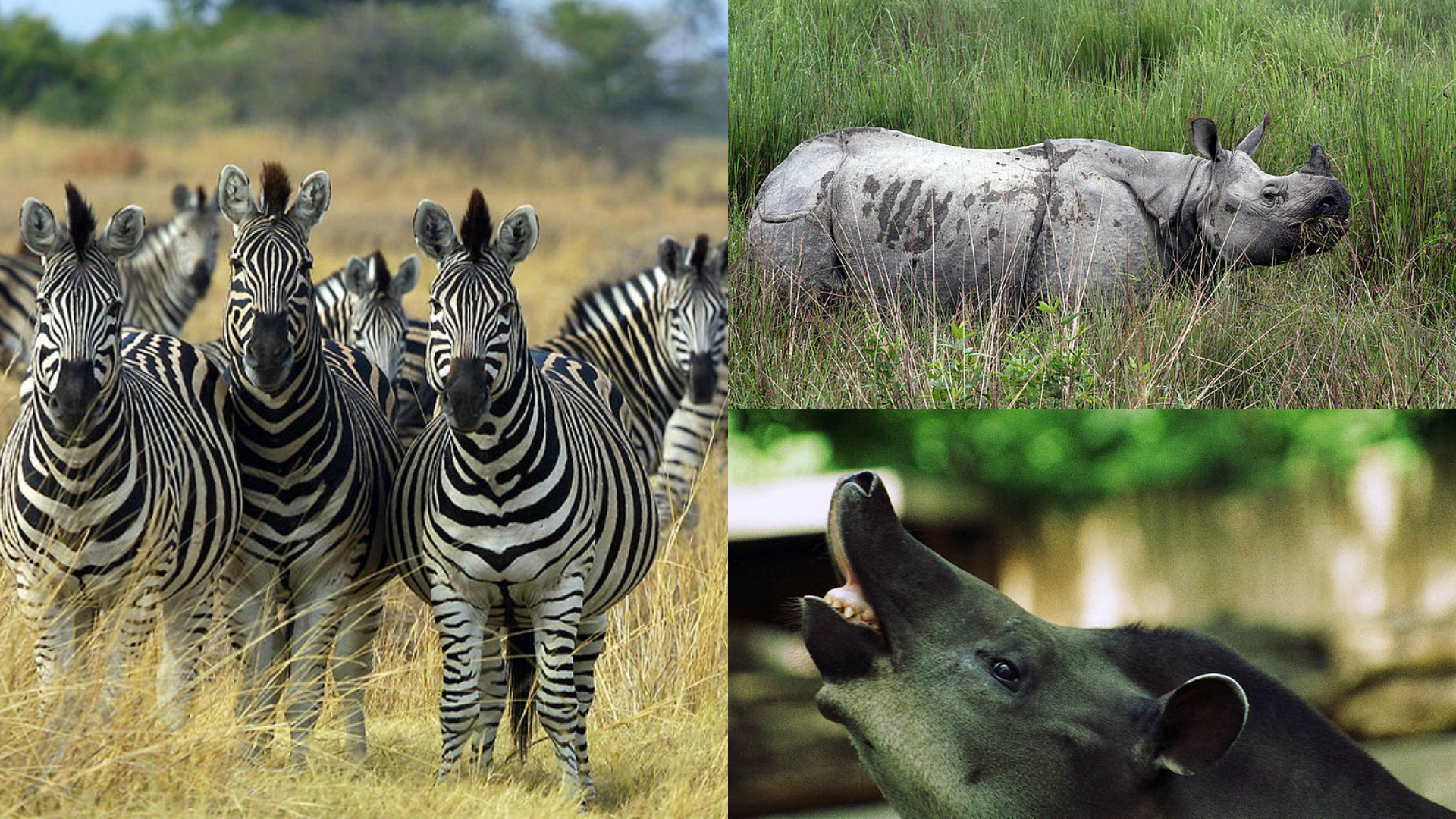
Three perissodactyl species (clockwise from left): plains zebra (Equus quagga), Indian rhinoceros (Rhinoceros unicornis) and South American tapir (Tapirus terrestris)

Perissodactyla is an order of placental mammals composed of odd-toed ungulates – hooved animals which bear weight on one or three of their five toes with the other toes either present, absent, vestigial, or pointing backwards. Members of this order are called perissodactyls, and include rhinoceroses, tapirs, and horses. They are primarily found in Africa, southern and southeastern Asia, and Central America, and are found in a variety of biomes, most typically grassland, savanna, inland wetlands, shrubland, and desert. Perissodactyls range in size from the 1.8 m (6 ft) long Baird's tapir to the 4 m (13 ft) long white rhinoceros. Over 50 million domesticated donkeys and 58 million horses are used in farming worldwide, while four species of perissodactyl have potentially fewer than 200 members remaining. Three subspecies of the black rhinoceros, the Syrian wild ass subspecies of the onager, and the tarpan subspecies of the wild horse have gone extinct in the last 200 years.

The eighteen extant species of Perissodactyla are divided into two suborders: Ceratomorpha, containing the families Rhinocerotidae and Tapiridae, and Hippomorpha, containing the family Equidae. Rhinocerotidae contains five species of rhinoceroses split into four genera, Tapiridae contains four species of tapir in a single genus, and Equidae contains nine species in a single genus, including horses, donkeys, and zebras. Over 75 extinct Perissodactyla species have been discovered, though due to ongoing research and discoveries the exact number and categorization is not fixed.

== Conventions ==
IUCN Red List categories
Conservation status
- EX: Extinct (0 species)
- EW: Extinct in the wild (0 species)
- CR: Critically endangered (4 species)
- EN: Endangered (5 species)
- VU: Vulnerable (3 species)
- NT: Near threatened (3 species)
- LC: Least concern (1 species)

Other categories
- DD: Data deficient (0 species)
- NE: Not evaluated (2 species)

The author citation for the species or genus is given after the scientific name; parentheses around the author citation indicate that this was not the original taxonomic placement. Conservation status codes listed follow the International Union for Conservation of Nature (IUCN) Red List of Threatened Species. Range maps are provided wherever possible; if a range map is not available, a description of the perissodactyl's range is provided. Ranges are based on the IUCN Red List for that species unless otherwise noted. All extinct species or subspecies listed alongside extant species went extinct after 1500 CE, and are indicated by a dagger symbol "†".

== Classification ==
The order Perissodactyla consists of two suborders, Ceratomorpha and Hippomorpha. Ceratomorpha contains the five species in four genera of the Rhinocerotidae family as well as the five species in one genera of the Tapiridae family. Hippomorpha contains a single family, Equidae, in turn containing nine species in a single genus. Many of these species are further subdivided into subspecies. This does not include hybrid species such as the mule, hinny, or zebroid, or extinct prehistoric species. Several perissodactyl subspecies have gone extinct in modern times, namely the southern black rhinoceros, north-eastern black rhinoceros, and western black rhinoceros subspecies of the black rhinoceros, the Syrian wild ass subspecies of the onager, and the tarpan subspecies of the wild horse.

Suborder Ceratomorpha

- Family Rhinocerotidae (rhinoceros)
  - Ceratotherium: 1 species
  - Dicerorhinus: 1 species
  - Diceros: 1 species
  - Rhinoceros: 2 species
- Family Tapiridae (tapir)
  - Tapirus: 4 species

Suborder Hippomorpha

- Family Equidae (horse, donkey, zebra)
  - Equus: 9 species

- Perissodactyla
  - Ceratomorpha
    - Rhinocerotidae
      - - Ceratotherium
        - Diceros
      - - Dicerorhinus
        - Rhinoceros
    - Tapiridae
      Tapirus
  - Hippomorpha
    - Equidae
      Equus

== Perissodactyls ==
The following classification is based on the taxonomy described by Mammal Species of the World (2005), with augmentation by generally accepted proposals made since using molecular phylogenetic analysis.

=== Suborder Ceratomorpha ===
==== Rhinocerotidae ====
Genus Ceratotherium – Gray, 1868 – one species
Common name	Scientific name and subspecies	Range	Size and ecology	IUCN status and estimated population
White rhinoceros	C. simum (Burchell, 1817) Two subspecies: C. s. cottoni (Northern white rhinoceros); C. s. simum (Southern white rhinoceros)	Central and southern Africa (Northern subspecies in orange)	Size: 370–400 cm (146–157 in) long, plus 28 cm (11 in) tail Habitat: Savanna, shrubland, and grassland Diet: Grass	NT 10,000

Genus Dicerorhinus – Gloger, 1841 – one species
Common name	Scientific name and subspecies	Range	Size and ecology	IUCN status and estimated population
Sumatran rhinoceros	D. sumatrensis (Fischer von Waldheim, 1814) Three subspecies: D. s. harrissoni (Bornean rhinoceros); D. s. lasiotis (Northern Sumatran rhinoceros); D. s. sumatrensis (Western Sumatran rhinoceros)	Scattered Sumatra and Borneo (former range in orange)	Size: 236–318 cm (93–125 in) long Habitat: Forest Diet: Twigs, leaves, fruit, and shoots	CR 30

Genus Diceros – Gray, 1821 – one species
Common name	Scientific name and subspecies	Range	Size and ecology	IUCN status and estimated population
Black rhinoceros	D. bicornis (Linnaeus, 1758) Eight subspecies: D. b. bicornis (Southern black rhinoceros)†; D. b. brucii (North-eastern black rhinoceros)†; D. b. chobiensis (Chobe black rhinoceros); D. b. ladoensis (Uganda black rhinoceros); D. b. longipes (Western black rhinoceros)†; D. b. michaeli (Eastern black rhinoceros); D. b. minor (South-central black rhinoceros); D. b. occidentalis (South-western black rhinoceros)	Southern Africa (extant in green, reintroduced extant in yellow, former range in red)	Size: 290–310 cm (114–122 in) long, plus 60 cm (24 in) tail Habitat: Savanna, shrubland, and desert Diet: Twigs, woody shrubs, small trees, legumes, and grass	CR 3,100

Genus Rhinoceros – Linnaeus, 1758 – two species
Common name	Scientific name and subspecies	Range	Size and ecology	IUCN status and estimated population
Indian rhinoceros	R. unicornis Linnaeus, 1758	Scattered northern Indian subcontinent	Size: 330–350 cm (130–138 in) long, plus 66 cm (26 in) tail Habitat: Forest, grassland, and inland wetlands Diet: Grass, fruit, leaves, branches, aquatic plants, and cultivated crops	VU 2,100–2,200
Javan rhinoceros	R. sondaicus Desmarest, 1822 Three subspecies: R. s. annamiticus (Vietnamese Javan rhinoceros); R. s. inermis (Lesser Indian rhinoceros); R. s. sondaicus (Indonesian Javan rhinoceros)	Western tip of Java (former range in orange)	Size: 300–350 cm (118–138 in) long Habitat: Forest Diet: Bamboo as well as parts of fig trees and guest trees	CR 18

==== Tapiridae ====
Genus Tapirus – Brisson, 1762 – four species
Common name	Scientific name and subspecies	Range	Size and ecology	IUCN status and estimated population
Baird's tapir	T. bairdii (Gill, 1865)	Central America	Size: 180–250 cm (71–98 in) long, plus 5–13 cm (2–5 in) tail Habitat: Forest, shrubland, grassland, and inland wetlands Diet: Leaves as well as fruit, twigs, flowers, sedges, and grass	EN Unknown
Malayan tapir	T. indicus (Desmarest, 1819) Two subspecies: T. i. brevetianus; T. i. indicus	Scattered southeastern Asia	Size: 250–300 cm (98–118 in) long, plus up to 10 cm (4 in) tail Habitat: Forest, grassland, and inland wetlands Diet: Leaves, buds, growing twigs, bark, herbs, low growing succulents, shrubs, fruit, club moss, grass, tubers, and aquatic plants	EN 2,500
Mountain tapir	T. pinchaque (Roulin, 1829)	Andes mountains in northwestern South America	Size: 180–200 cm (71–79 in) long, plus up to 10 cm (4 in) tail Habitat: Forest, shrubland, grassland, and inland wetlands Diet: Shrub leaves	EN 2,500
South American tapir	T. terrestris (Linnaeus, 1758) Four subspecies: T. t. aenigmaticus; T. t. colombianus; T. t. spegazzinii; T. t. terrestris	Northern and eastern South America	Size: 190–240 cm (75–94 in) long, plus up to 10 cm (4 in) tail Habitat: Forest, savanna, shrubland, grassland, and inland wetlands Diet: Fruit, leaves, and other plant material	VU Unknown

=== Suborder Hippomorpha ===
==== Equidae ====
Genus Equus – Linnaeus, 1758 – nine species
Common name	Scientific name and subspecies	Range	Size and ecology	IUCN status and estimated population
African wild ass	E. africanus (Heuglin, Fitzinger, 1866) Two subspecies: E. a. africanus (Nubian wild ass); E. a. somalicus (Somali wild ass)	Scattered northeastern Africa	Size: 230–250 cm (91–98 in) long, plus 40–45 cm (16–18 in) tail Habitat: Shrubland, grassland, and desert Diet: Grass as well as shrubs	CR 20–200
Donkey	E. asinus Linnaeus, 1758	Worldwide	Size: 190–200 in (4,826–5,080 mm) long, plus 40–50 cm (16–20 in) tail Habitat: Desert Diet: Grass, as well as shrubs and desert plants	NE Unknown (about 50.4 million used in farming, not including 8.5 million mules)
Grévy's zebra	E. grevyi Oustalet, 1882	Scattered eastern Africa	Size: 250–300 cm (98–118 in) long, plus 38–60 cm (15–24 in) tail Habitat: Shrubland and grassland Diet: Grass	EN 2,000
Horse	E. caballus Linnaeus, 1758	Worldwide	Size: 220–280 cm (87–110 in) long Habitat: Grassland, savanna, inland wetlands, and shrubland Diet: Grains, grass, and shrubs	NE Unknown (58 million used in farming)
Kiang	E. kiang Moorcroft, 1841 Three subspecies: E. k. holdereri (Eastern kiang); E. k. kiang (Western kiang); E. k. polyodon (Southern kiang)	Central Asia	Size: 182–214 in (4,623–5,436 mm) long, plus 32–45 cm (13–18 in) tail Habitat: Shrubland, grassland, and desert Diet: Grass as well as sedges	LC 60,000–70,000
Mountain zebra	E. zebra Linnaeus, 1758 Two subspecies: E. z. hartmannae (Hartmann's mountain zebra); E. z. zebra (Cape mountain zebra)	Scattered southern Africa	Size: 210–260 cm (83–102 in) long, plus 40–55 cm (16–22 in) tail Habitat: Savanna, shrubland, and grassland Diet: Grass	VU 35,000
Onager	E. hemionus Pallas, 1775 Five subspecies: E. h. hemionus (Mongolian wild ass); E. h. hemippus (Syrian wild ass)†; E. h. khur (Indian wild ass); E. h. kulan (Turkmenian kulan); E. h. onager (Persian onager)	Central Asia and scattered western Asia	Size: 200–250 cm (79–98 in) long, plus 30–49 cm (12–19 in) tail Habitat: Savanna, shrubland, grassland, and desert Diet: Grass and succulent plants	NT 65,000
Plains zebra	E. quagga Boddaert, 1785	Southern and southeastern Africa	Size: 220–250 cm (87–98 in) long, plus 47–56 cm (19–22 in) tail Habitat: Savanna, shrubland, and grassland Diet: Grass, as well as leaves and buds	NT 150,000–250,000
Wild horse	E. ferus Boddaert, 1785 Two subspecies: E. f. ferus (Tarpan)†; E. f. przewalskii (Przewalski's horse)	Central Asia	Size: 220–260 cm (87–102 in) long, plus 80–110 cm (31–43 in) tail Habitat: Grassland and desert Diet: Grass, leaves, and buds	EN 200

== Sources ==
- Burnie, David (2017). Animal: The Definitive Visual Guide. DK. ISBN 978-1-4654-7086-7.
- Stuart, Chris (2017). Stuarts' Field Guide to the Larger Mammals of Africa. Penguin Random House South Africa. ISBN 978-1-920572-28-0.
- Grubb, Peter (2005). Wilson, Don E.; Reeder, DeeAnn M. (eds.). Mammal Species of the World. Vol. 1 (3rd ed.). Johns Hopkins University Press. ISBN 978-0-8018-8221-0.
