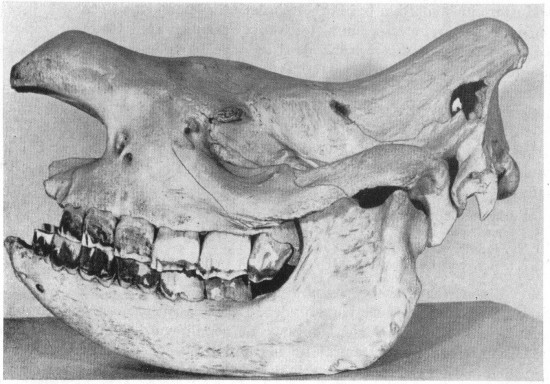
- Holotype specimen, a female shot in 1911

Conservation status
- Extinct (2011) (IUCN 3.1)

Scientific classification
- Kingdom: Animalia
- Phylum: Chordata
- Class: Mammalia
- Order: Perissodactyla
- Family: Rhinocerotidae
- Genus: Diceros
- Species: D. bicornis
- Subspecies: †D. b. longipes

Trinomial name
- †Diceros bicornis longipes Zukowsky, 1949

= Western black rhinoceros =

Extinct subspecies of mammal

The western black rhinoceros (Diceros bicornis longipes) or West African black rhinoceros is an extinct subspecies of the black rhinoceros. It was declared extinct by the IUCN in 2011. The western black rhinoceros was believed to have been genetically different from other rhino subspecies. It was once widespread in the savanna of sub-Saharan Africa, but its numbers declined due to poaching. The western black rhinoceros resided primarily in Cameroon, but surveys since 2006 have failed to locate any individuals.

== Taxonomy ==
This subspecies was named Diceros bicornis longipes by Ludwig Zukowsky in 1949. The word "longipes" is of Latin origin, combining longus ("far, long") and pēs ("foot"). This refers to the subspecies' long distal limb segment, one of many special characteristics of the subspecies. Other distinct features of the western black rhino included the square based horn, first mandibular premolar retained in the adults, simple formed crochet of the maxillary premolar, and premolars commonly possessed crista.

The population was first discovered in Southwest Chad, Central African Republic (CAR), North Cameroon, and Northeast Nigeria.

The western black rhinoceros is one of three subspecies of the black rhinoceros to become extinct in historical times, the other two being the southern black rhinoceros and the north-eastern black rhinoceros.

== Description ==
The western black rhinoceros measured 2.8–3.75 m (9.2–12.3 ft) long, had a shoulder height of 1.32–1.8 m (4.3–5.9 ft), and weighed 800–1,400 kg (1,760–3,090 lb) on average, and unusually large male specimens have been reported at up to 2,896 kg (6,385 lb). It had two horns, the first measuring 0.5–1.359 m (1.64–4.46 ft) and the second 2–55 cm (0.79–21.65 in). Like all Black Rhinos, they were browsers, and their common diet included leafy plants and shoots around their habitat. During the morning or evening, they would browse for food. During the hottest parts of the day, they slept or wallowed. They inhabited much of sub-Saharan Africa. Many people believe their horns held medicinal value, which led to heavy poaching. However, this belief has no grounding in scientific fact. Like most black rhinos, they are believed to have been nearsighted and would often rely on local birds, such as the red-billed oxpecker, to help them detect incoming threats.

== Distribution ==
The black rhino, of which the western black rhinoceros is a subspecies, was most commonly located in several countries towards the southeast region of the continent of Africa. The native countries of the black rhino included Angola, Botswana, Cameroon, Chad, Eswatini, Ethiopia, Kenya, Malawi, Mozambique, Namibia, Rwanda, South Africa, Tanzania, Zambia, and Zimbabwe. There were several subspecies found in the western and southern countries of Tanzania through Zambia, Zimbabwe and Mozambique, to the northern and north-western and north-eastern parts of South Africa. The Black Rhino's most abundant population was found in South Africa and Zimbabwe, with a smaller population found in southern Tanzania. The Western subspecies of the Black Rhino was last recorded in Cameroon but is now considered to be extinct. However, other subspecies were introduced again into Botswana, Eswatini, Malawi, and Zambia.

== Population and decline ==
The western black rhinoceros was hunted heavily in the beginning of the 20th century, but the population rose in the 1930s after preservation actions were taken. As protection efforts declined over the years, so did the number of western black rhinos. By 1980, the population was in the hundreds. No animals are known to be held in captivity; however, it was believed in 1988 that approximately 20–30 were being kept for breeding purposes. Poaching continued and, by 2000, only an estimated ten western black rhinos survived. In 2001, this number dwindled to only five. While it was believed that around thirty still existed in 2004, this was later found to be based upon falsified data.

The western black rhino emerged about seven to eight million years ago. It was a sub-species of the black rhino. For much of the 20th century, its population was the highest out of all of the rhino species, at almost 850,000 individuals. There was a 96% population decline in black rhinos, including the western black rhino, between 1970 and 1992. Widespread poaching is concluded to be partly responsible for bringing the species close to extinction, along with farmers killing rhinos to defend their crops in areas close to rhino territories.

The sub-species officially was declared extinct in 2011, with its last sighting reported in 2006 in Cameroon's Northern Province.

In 2006, for six months, the NGO Symbiose and veterinarians Isabelle and Jean-François Lagrot with their local teams examined the common roaming ground of Diceros bicornis longipes in the northern province of Cameroon to assess the status of the last population of the western black rhino subspecies. For this experiment, 2,500 kilometres (1,600 mi) of patrol effort resulted in no sign of rhino presence over the course of six months. The teams had concluded that the rhino was extinct approximately five years before it was officially declared so by the IUCN.

=== Protection attempts ===
There were many attempts to revive the western black and northern white rhinoceroses. Rhino sperm was conserved in order to artificially fertilize females to produce offspring. Some attempts were successful, but most experiments failed due to different reasons, including stress and reduced time in the wild.

In 1999, World Wide Fund for Nature (WWF) published a report called "African Rhino: Status Survey and Conservation Action Plan." This report recommended that all surviving specimens of the western black rhino should be captured and placed in a specific region of modern Cameroon, in order to facilitate monitoring and reduce the attack rates of poachers. This experiment failed due to corruption. It demanded a large amount of money, and the risk of failure was very high.

Western black rhinos were conserved in National Conservative parks, which did not halt their extinction. To monitor and protect white rhinos, WWF focuses on better-integrated intelligence gathering networks on rhino poaching and trade, more antipoaching patrols and better-equipped conservation law enforcement officers. WWF is setting up an Africa-wide rhino database using rhino horn DNA analysis (RhoDIS), which contributes to forensic investigations at the scene of the crime and for court evidence to greatly strengthen prosecution cases. WWF supports accredited training in environmental and crime courses, some of which have been adopted by South Africa Wildlife College. Special prosecutors have been appointed in countries like Kenya and South Africa to prosecute rhino crimes in a bid to deal with the mounting arrests and bring criminals to face swift justice with commensurate penalties.

== Traditional Chinese medicine ==
In the 1950s, Mao Zedong effectively encouraged traditional Chinese medicine in an attempt to counter Western influences. While attempting to modernize this industry, several species were hunted. According to the official data published by the SATCM, 11,146 botanical and 1,581 zoological species, as well as 80 minerals were used. The western black rhino was hunted due to the value of its horn, which was believed to have the power to cure specific ailments and to be effective at detecting poisons (due to its high alkaline content). Price for horns could be high; for example 1 kg of horn could cost more than $50,000, and the extinction of the species only increases the rarity and value of the horn.

== Other uses for the horn ==
Rhino horns were used in making ceremonial knife handles called "Jambiya". The hilt type known as saifani uses rhinoceros horn as material and is a symbol of wealth and status due to its cost.

In modern times, horns of other rhinoceros species are very valuable and can cost up to $100,000 per kg in places of high demand (e.g. Vietnam). An average horn may weigh between 1 and 3 kg. While locally respected doctors in Vietnam vouch for the rhino horns' cancer-curing properties, there is no scientific evidence for this or any other imputed medical property of the horns.
