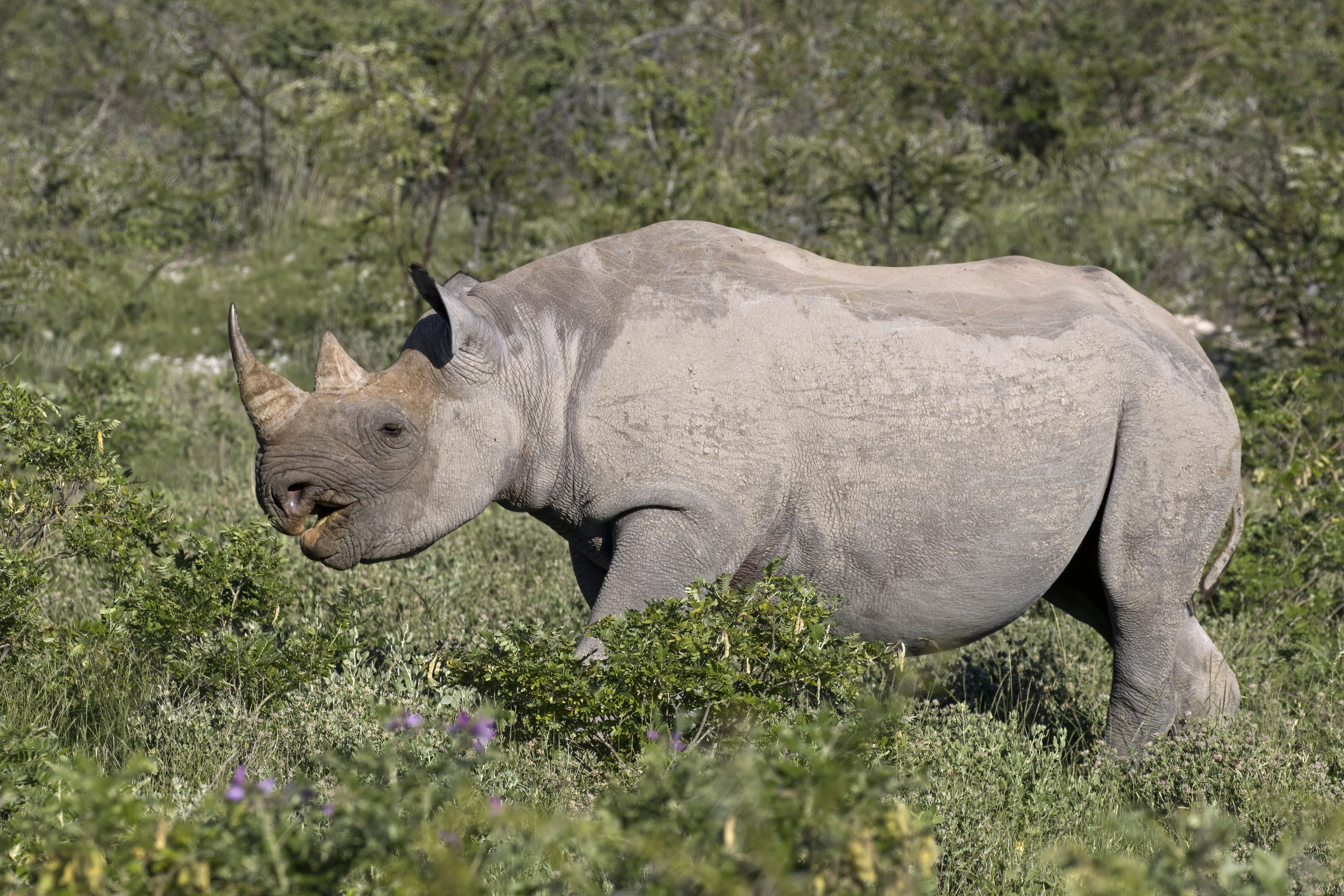
- Female, Etosha National Park, Namibia

Conservation status
- Near Threatened (IUCN 3.1)

Scientific classification
- Kingdom: Animalia
- Phylum: Chordata
- Class: Mammalia
- Order: Perissodactyla
- Family: Rhinocerotidae
- Genus: Diceros
- Species: D. bicornis
- Subspecies: D. b. occidentalis

Trinomial name
- Diceros bicornis occidentalis (Zukowsky, 1922)

= South-western black rhinoceros =

Subspecies of the black rhinoceros

The south-western black rhinoceros (Diceros bicornis occidentalis) is a subspecies of the black rhinoceros, living in southwestern Africa (northern Namibia and southern Angola, introduced to South Africa). It is currently listed as near threatened by the IUCN. The biggest threat towards the subspecies is illegal poaching.

== Taxonomy ==
This subspecies is often mistaken for either the extinct southern black rhinoceros (D. b. bicornis) or the southeastern subspecies (D. b. minor). However, the populations in the arid areas of northern Namibia and southwestern Angola represent a separate subspecies.

The holotype specimen, a male, was about 16 months old when caught alive by a Mr. Müller in 1914 near the Kunene River (Kaokoveld, border region between Namibia and Angola), and shipped to the Tierpark Hagenbeck, the Hamburg Zoo, in Germany. After its death on 15 October 1916, its hide and skeleton was preserved at the Zoologisches Museum Hamburg (specimen no. 40056) and described as belonging to a new species, Opsiceros occidentalis, by L. Zukowsky in 1922. Opsiceros is an invalid synonym of the genus Diceros.

== Description ==
The south-western black rhino, like all black rhino subspecies, has a distinct prehensile lip and is a browser. Its appearance is similar to other subspecies, the most important difference to them is a relatively broad head behind the eyes and minor features in the dentition. Other characters often mentioned, like body size or the straightness and size of the horns, are subject to individual variation. They also are most adapted to arid habitat and can be found in arid savanna and desert climates.

== Population and threats ==
Historically, this subspecies once roamed in Angola, and Namibia, but their current range has decreased. The stronghold of the species is primarily in Namibia. One to four specimens have been reported from Angola and others were introduced to South Africa. Its total population is increasing and numbered to 1,920 animals in 2010, with 55.8% adults. Poaching due to increasing horn prices is considered the main threat to their population. They successfully breed with the south-central black rhinoceros.

=== IUCN status ===
The IUCN considers the living northern Namibian black rhino populations to belong to the subspecies D. bicornis bicornis, and does not recognize a separate D. b. occidentalis. This synonymy, based upon du Toit (1987) was, however, considered erroneous by Groves and Grubb (2011), and D. b. occidentalis was re-established as a valid subspecies. As all southernmost populations of black rhinoceros were exterminated by the mid-19th century, D. b. bicornis is completely extinct today.
