= Chobe Rhinoceros =

Scientific classification
- Kingdom: Animalia
- Phylum: Chordata
- Class: Mammalia
- Infraclass: Placentalia
- Order: Perissodactyla
- Family: Rhinocerotidae
- Genus: Diceros
- Species: D. bicornis
- Subspecies: D. b. chobiensis

Trinomial name
- Diceros bicornis chobiensis Zukowsky, 1965

Synonyms
- Diceros bicornis angolensis

Subspecies of mammal

Chobe Rhinoceros or Chobe Black Rhinoceros (Diceros bicornis chobiensis) is a subspecies of the black rhinoceros (Diceros bicornis). Its range is restricted to the Chobe Valley in southeastern Angola, Namibia (Zambezi Region) and northern Botswana. It is nearly extinct, with possibly only one surviving specimen in Botswana.

The subspecies was first described by German zoologist, Ludwig Zukowsky, in 1965.
