= Xihoudu =

Archaeological site in Shanxi Province, China

- Location within Shanxi Location within China
- 34.693056°N 110.27°E
- Type: Paleolithic
- Periods: Pleistocene
- Location: Shanxi
- Region: North China
- Part of: Paleolithic China

Xihoudu (Chinese: 西侯度; pinyin: Xīhóudù) is an archeological site located in the Shanxi Province of China. The site has been dated to 2.43 million years ago, i.e. the Paleolithic Age. In total 32 stone implements were found at the site.

== Discovery ==
In 1929, Chinese prehistoric archaeologist and paleontologist Professor Pei Wenzhong discovered the skull fossil of the "Peking Man", which was thought to be 500,000 years old at that time, at the Zhoukoudian site in Beijing. However, the Paleolithic archaeologist Wang Jian(王建) inferred that there must have been more primitive humans before the "Peking Man". This inference was affirmed by the paleoanthropologist Professor Jia Lanpo(贾兰坡). In order to prove their theoretical inference, Jia Lanpo, Wang Jian and others analyzed from the aspects of paleogeography and paleoclimate, and began to search for human remains in the Nihewan stratum.

In 1959, archaeologists discovered the site on a terrace 170 meters above the river surface on the east bank of the Yellow River in Xihoudu Village, Ruicheng County. Three excavations were carried out in 1961, 1962, and 2005. Dating back 1.8 million years, it is the oldest known Paleolithic cultural sites in China.

In 1983, the Ruicheng County People's Government established the Xihoudu Cultural Relics Protection Group; in 1986, the Shanxi Provincial People's Government announced the Xihoudu Cultural Site as a key cultural relic protection unit in the province; in 1988, the Xihoudu Site was designated as a national key cultural relic Protection unit (third batch). In 2013, the cultural relics department of Ruicheng County, Shanxi Province built the Xihoudu Site Exhibition Hall with a total construction area of about 130 square meters to protect the unearthed cultural relics.

== Geography ==
The Xihoudu site is located on the sunny slope of Zhongtiao Mountain in the northwest corner of Ruicheng County in the south of Shanxi Province, in the middle reaches of the Yellow River. Archaeologists believe that in ancient times, the climate here was mild and the aquatic plants were abundant; there were ancient Chinese bison, Shanxi woolly rhinoceros, Equus sanmeniensis (ancient horse), gazella blacki (ancient gazelle), Palaeoloxodon namadicus (paleo elephant), Sus lydekkeri, Père David's deer, etc. There are all kinds of fish. Such a natural environment is suitable for human survival and reproduction.

== Archaeological Site ==
A total of 32 stone artifacts were discovered at the Xihoudu site in the 1960s, including stone cores, flakes, and stone tools. They are among the earliest stone tools discovered in China. The stone tooling technology is relatively primitive, the raw material is quartzite of various colors, there are also a small amount of vein quartz and volcanic rock. During more than 50 days of excavation in 2005, more than 1,500 stone products and animal fossil specimens were found. Among the stone products, there are many fine products and standardized products with lighter abrasion and clear strike marks.

Some relics coexisting with stone tools include cut or scraped antlers, as well as burned animal bones, horns and teeth, which are considered to be signs of human use of fire. The history of the ancient Chinese people using fire at the Xihoudu site has advanced 1.1 million years from 500,000 to 700,000 years ago in Zhoukoudian Peking.

The coexisting animal fossils include ostrich, Castoroides, hedgehog, rabbit, Palaeoloxodon namadicus (paleo elephant), Sus lydekkeri (ancient boar), Père David's deer, Axis shansius (ancient deer), flat-fronted elephant (Elephas planifrons), hyena, Shanxi woolly rhinoceros, Elasmotherium, Equus sanmeniensis (ancient horse), Hippotherium, ancient Chinese bisons(Bison palaeosinensis), Leptobos, gazella blacki (ancient gazelle) and Euctenoceros boulei, etc.

== Disputes ==
After the discovery of the Xihoudu site, it has not been fully recognized by the academic community. There are disagreements and disputes about whether the unearthed stone tools were made by hand. Pei Wenzhong, Zhang Senshui(张森水), etc. believe that the "artificial nature of stone tools cannot be determined" and suspect that it was caused by river collisions Experts from the Shanxi Provincial Institute of Archaeology believe that the most effective way to resolve these disputes and problems is to further excavate to obtain new information.

In 2020, a new study of 39 lithics produced an isochron 26Al/10Be (aluminum-26 to beryllium-10) burial dating of Xihoudu of 2.43 Ma. This would make Xihoudu the oldest paleolithic site in China.
