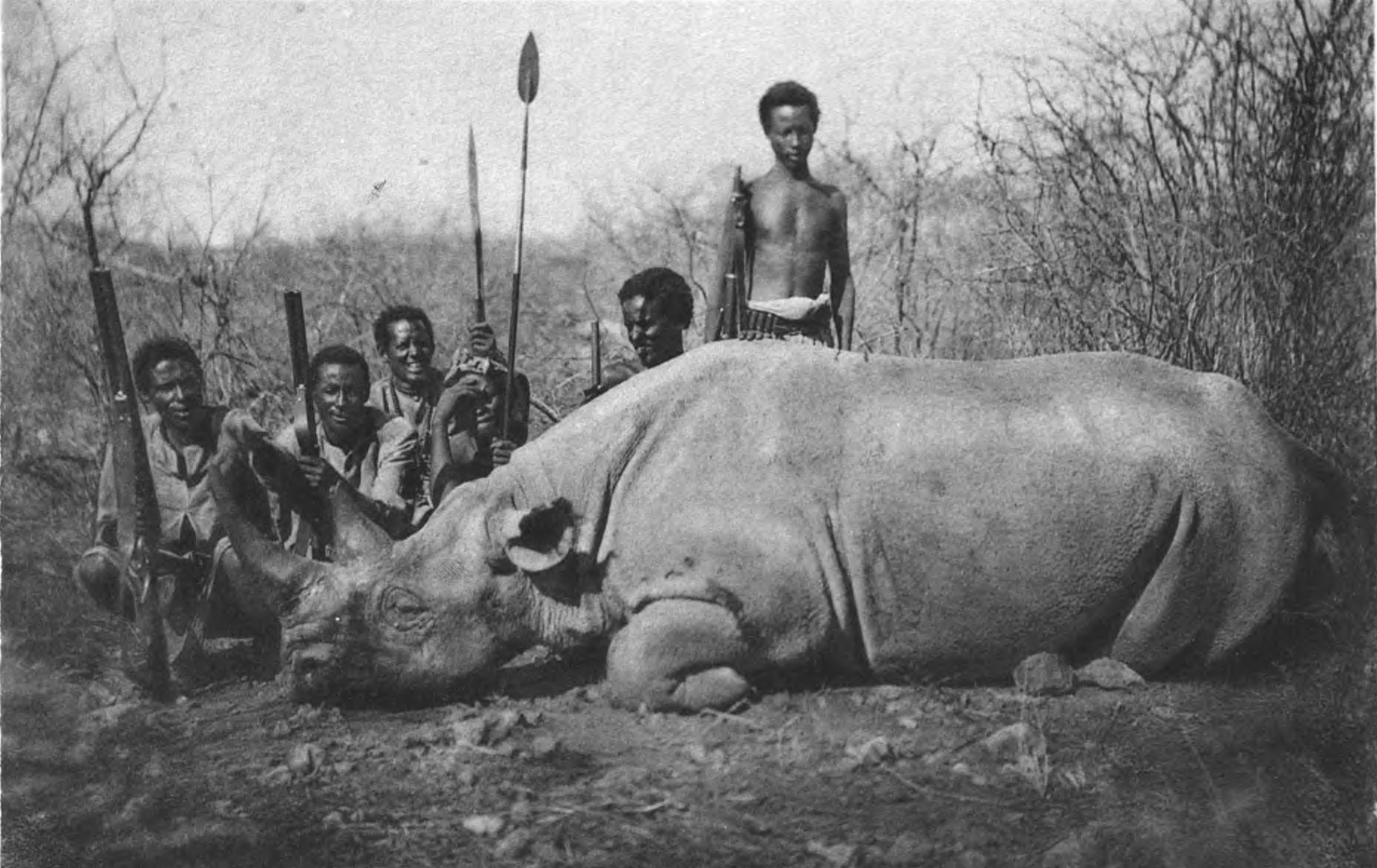
- A north-eastern black rhinoceros (D. b. brucii) shot in Somalia, 1894

Conservation status
- Extinct (IUCN 3.1)

Scientific classification
- Kingdom: Animalia
- Phylum: Chordata
- Class: Mammalia
- Order: Perissodactyla
- Family: Rhinocerotidae
- Genus: Diceros
- Species: D. bicornis
- Subspecies: D. b. brucii

Trinomial name
- Diceros bicornis brucii Lesson, 1842

Synonyms
- Diceros bicornis atbarensis Zukowsky; Diceros bicornis palustris Benzon; Diceros bicornis porrhoceros Brandt; Diceros bicornis somaliensis Potocki

= North-eastern black rhinoceros =

Extinct subspecies of mammal

The north-eastern black rhinoceros (Diceros bicornis brucii) is an extinct subspecies of the black rhinoceros (Diceros bicornis) that was native to central Sudan, parts of Ethiopia, Djibouti, and Somalia. Its Somalian range was the last to be eradicated, the subspecies becoming extinct sometime in the early 20th century.
