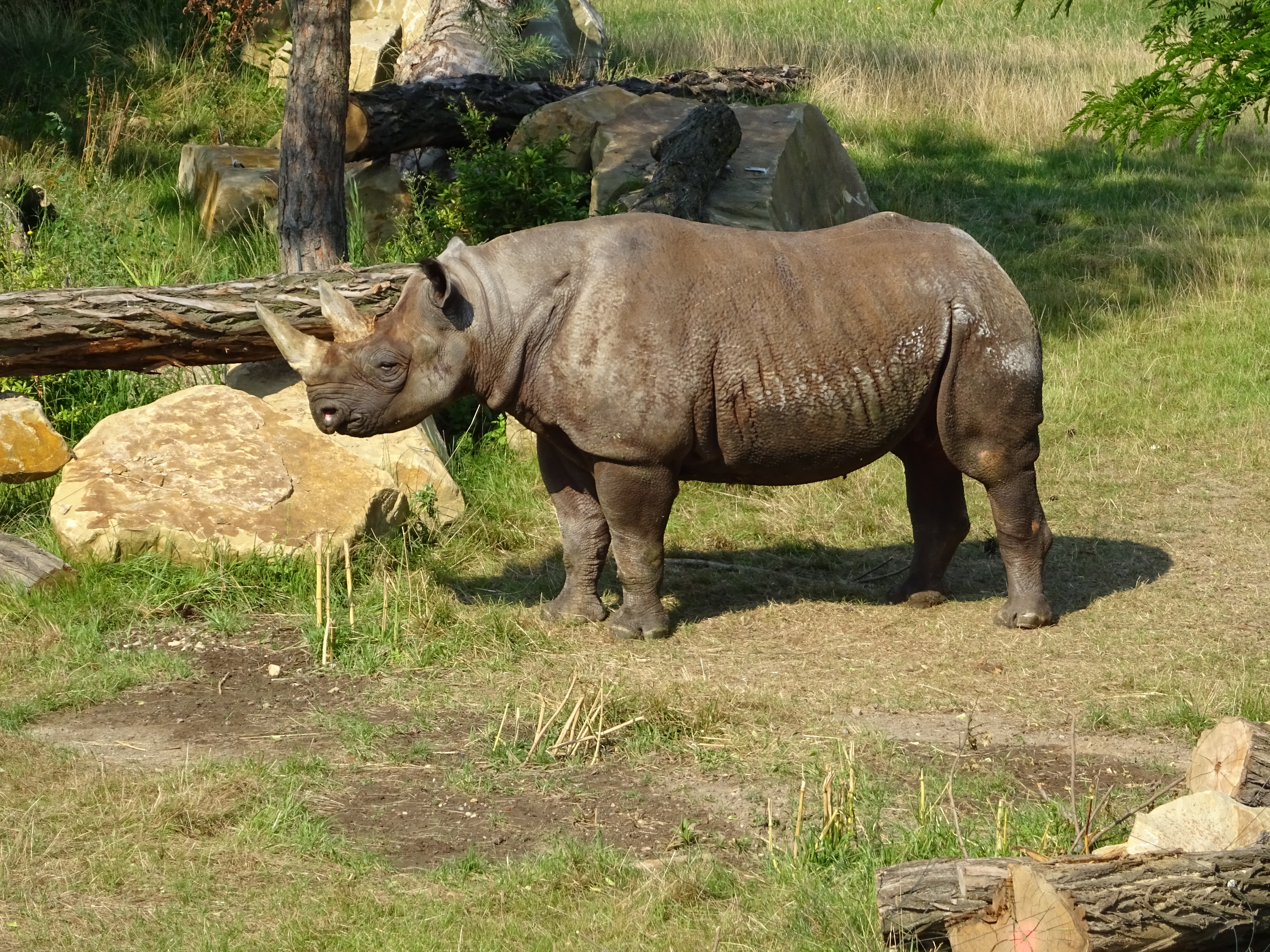
- An eastern black rhinoceros at Leipzig Zoological Garden, Germany

Conservation status
- Critically Endangered (IUCN 3.1)

Scientific classification
- Kingdom: Animalia
- Phylum: Chordata
- Class: Mammalia
- Order: Perissodactyla
- Family: Rhinocerotidae
- Genus: Diceros
- Species: D. bicornis
- Subspecies: D. b. michaeli

Trinomial name
- Diceros bicornis michaeli Zukowsky, 1965

= Eastern black rhinoceros =

Critically endangered rhinoceros subspecies

The eastern black rhinoceros (Diceros bicornis michaeli), also known as the East African black rhinoceros, is a subspecies of the black rhinoceros. Its numbers are very low due to poaching for its horn, and it is listed as critically endangered.

== Description ==
The eastern black rhino is distinguishable from the southern subspecies as it has a longer, leaner, and more curved horn. Its skin is also very grooved. Diceros bicornis michaeli is also reportedly more aggressive than the other three subspecies of black rhino. They are browsers and are usually found in highland forest and savanna habitat.

== Population and threats ==
Once located in Ethiopia, Somalia, Tanzania and Kenya, as of 2017 they can only be found in Kenya (594 animals), Rwanda and in northern Tanzania (80 animals). A population of currently 100 animals is kept outside its natural range in Limpopo, South Africa in the Thaba Tholo Game Ranch . The population has declined 90% in the last three generations. In 2010 their total numbers were estimated at 740 animals, with an increasing trend. They are threatened mainly from illegal poaching for their horns.

The IUCN figures for Diceros bicornis michaeli also include those for black rhinos from South Sudan, Uganda, southwestern Ethiopia and western Kenya. These are referred to a separate subspecies (Diceros bicornis ladoensis) by some authorities. As the black rhinoceros population is extirpated in most of these areas, the status of the latter subspecies is unclear.

These black rhinos were examined by Benson and others through the Kenya Wildlife Service and had an article published by the African Journal of Ecology (Benson, 1, 791). Each individual rhino's relationship concerning "density dependence...sex ratio, and underlying growth rates" was the team's main focus. The rhino began increasing its population growth to the point when growth rate was nonexistent.

Eastern black rhinos in general are currently listed as threatened under the Conservation Status for a number of factors, but mainly due to illegal poaching. The 90% decline in their population is a hazard as mortality rates increase, as is consistent emigration (Primack, 2002). The reason why the rhino increases its densities and their birth rate decreases is because of the continuous threat of poaching and emigration.

Sex ratio brings about reproduction issues because the male numbers begin to dominate, leaving too low of a number of females to allow positive, consistent birth and growth rates (Benson, 2, 792).
