= Diceros praecox =

Diceros praecox Temporal range: Pliocene

Scientific classification
- Kingdom: Animalia
- Phylum: Chordata
- Class: Mammalia
- Order: Perissodactyla
- Family: Rhinocerotidae
- Genus: Diceros
- Species: †D. praecox

Binomial name
- †Diceros praecox Hooijer & Patterson, 1972

Synonyms
- Ceratotherium praecox

Extinct species of rhinoceros

Diceros praecox is an extinct species of rhinoceros that lived in Africa during the Pliocene, around 4 million years ago. It has been suggested to be the direct ancestor of the living black rhinoceros (Diceros bicornis).

== Taxonomy ==
Diceros praecox has for many years been classified as Ceratotherium praecox, however the original material describing the species has been shown to be closer to the black rhinoceros in its skull morphology. Other material showing greater similarities with the white rhinoceros are considered to belong to a different species, Ceratotherium mauritanicum. D. praecox has been suggested to have arose from Ceratotherium neumayri, however the close relationship between C. neumayri and Diceros has been disputed by other authors.

== Description ==
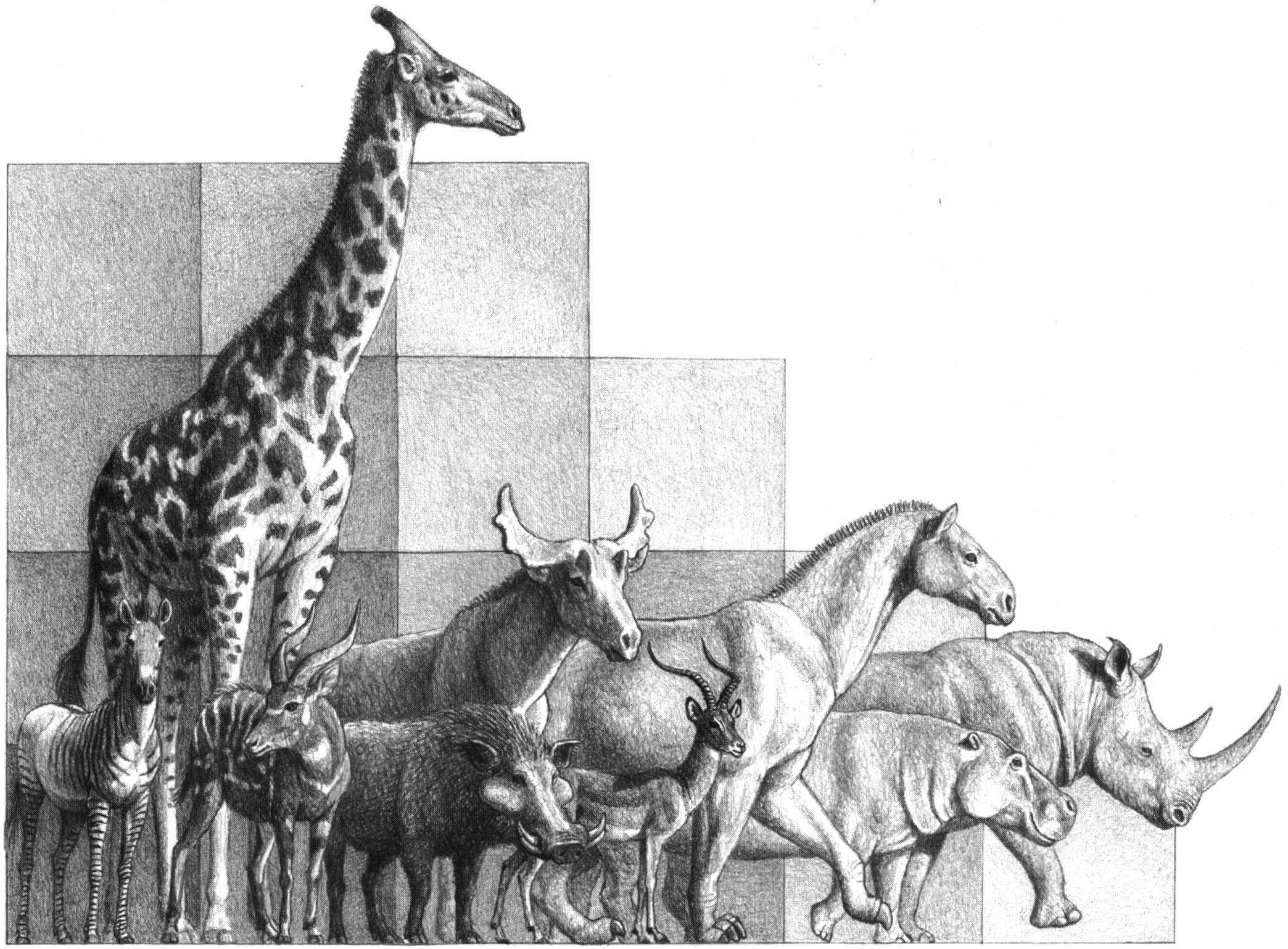
Ungulates from the Pliocene of eastern Africa, including D. praecox (right)

The teeth of D. praecox are similar to those of Ceratotherium neumayri. However, the longer skull suggests increased browsing specialization. The break-off of Diceros from Ceratotherium probably indicates ecological divergence and character displacement between browsing versus grazing specializations.
