= Diceros gansuensis =

Scientific classification
- Domain: Eukaryota
- Kingdom: Animalia
- Phylum: Chordata
- Class: Mammalia
- Order: Perissodactyla
- Family: Rhinocerotidae
- Genus: Diceros
- Species: D. gansuensis

Binomial name
- Diceros gansuensis Deng & Qiu 2007

Extinct species of mammal

Diceros gansuensis is an extinct species of Diceros that lived in China during the Late Miocene.

== Palaeoecology ==
Diceros gansuensis fed on leaves of plants belonging to Caprifoliaceae and Juglandaceae, as well as potentially from Ranunculaceae and Polygonaceae.
