= Southern black rhinoceros =

Conservation status
- Extinct (~ ca.1850) (IUCN 3.1)

Scientific classification
- Kingdom: Animalia
- Phylum: Chordata
- Class: Mammalia
- Order: Perissodactyla
- Family: Rhinocerotidae
- Genus: Diceros
- Species: D. bicornis
- Subspecies: †D. b. bicornis

Trinomial name
- †Diceros bicornis bicornis (Linnaeus, 1758)
- D. bicornis bicornis approximal historical range (ca. 1700 A.D.).

Extinct subspecies of mammal

The southern black rhinoceros, southern hook-lipped rhinoceros or Cape rhinoceros (Diceros bicornis bicornis) is an extinct subspecies of the black rhinoceros that was once abundant in South Africa from the Cape Province to Transvaal, southern Namibia, and possibly also Lesotho and southern Botswana. Zoos, animal sanctuaries and conservation centers use this same scientific name as an indicating reference to the surviving south-central black rhinoceros. This former species was brought to extinction by excessive hunting and habitat destruction around 1850.

== Taxonomy ==
It is unknown from where the original specimen (the holotype), on which Carl Linnaeus based "Rhinoceros" bicornis in 1758, was collected. It was even proposed that it was indeed the skull of an Indian rhino (Rhinoceros unicornis) with a faked second horn, as Linnaeus erroneously noted India as occurrence. This was fixed formally in 1911, when O. Thomas declared the Cape of Good Hope as type locality of D. bicornis. Therefore, this population formed the base of the nominal subspecies of the black rhinoceros. Later this subspecies became frequently mistaken for the south-western black rhinoceros, but the latter has to be considered a separate subspecies (D. bicornis occidentalis).

== Description ==
D. bicornis bicornis was the largest of all black rhino subspecies. While the differentiation of subspecies is mostly based on skull and body proportions, as well as details of the dentition, the external appearance of the southern subspecies is not exactly known because no photos exist. The skull was the largest of any known subspecies and proportionally large compared to the body. The limbs were short but slender and the skin folds were probably only weakly pronounced.

== Ecology ==
This subspecies was restricted to well-vegetated regions, in contrast to others that are well adapted to desertic conditions.

== IUCN status ==
As the IUCN considers the living northern Namibian black rhino populations (D. bicornis occidentalis) to belong to D. bicornis bicornis, the latter is listed as "vulnerable" instead of "extinct". This synonymy, based upon du Toit (1987) was, however, considered erroneous by Groves and Grubb (2011).
