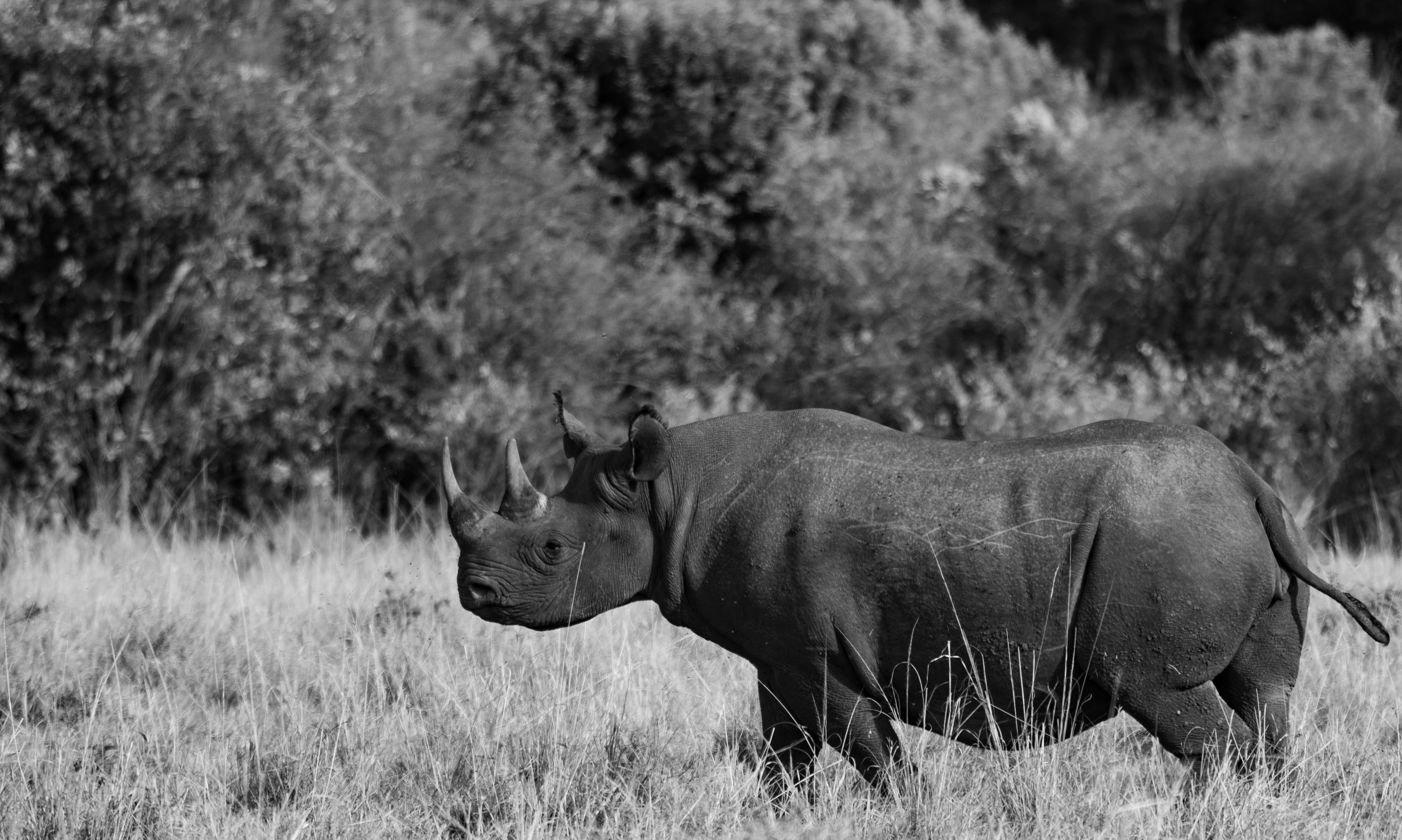

Scientific classification
- Kingdom: Animalia
- Phylum: Chordata
- Class: Mammalia
- Order: Perissodactyla
- Family: Rhinocerotidae
- Genus: Diceros
- Species: D. bicornis
- Subspecies: D. b. ladoensis

Trinomial name
- Diceros bicornis ladoensis Groves, 1967

= Uganda black rhinoceros =

Subspecies of mammal

The Uganda black rhinoceros (Diceros bicornis ladoensis) is a subspecies of the black rhinoceros (Diceros bicornis) that was native to parts of South Sudan, Uganda, Kenya, and Ethiopia, but is currently limited to a select few Kenyan nature reserves. It is unknown if the subspecies is extinct or not.
