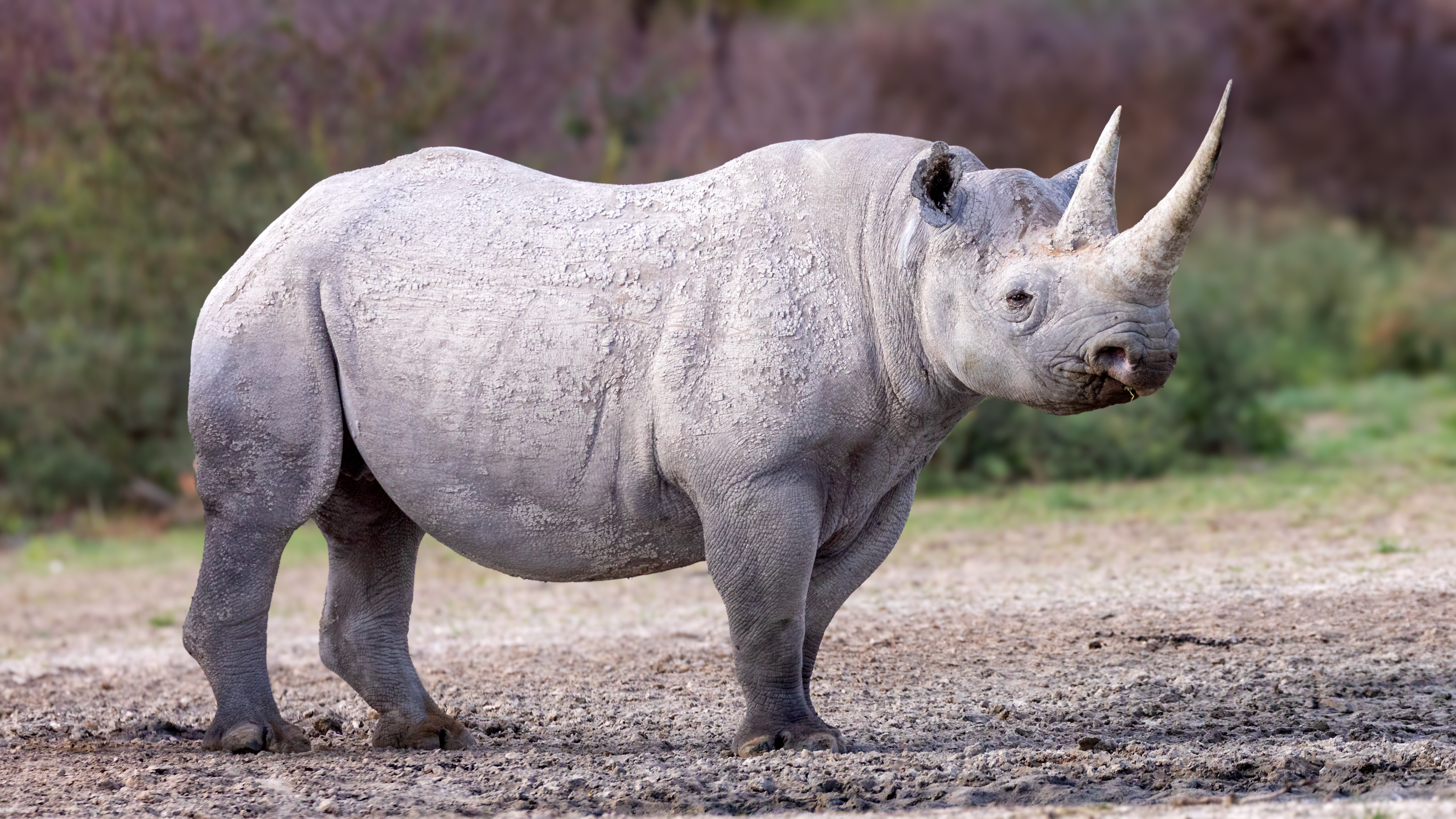
- A south-central black rhinoceros (D. b. minor) in South Africa

Conservation status
- Critically Endangered (IUCN 3.1)
- CITES Appendix I

Scientific classification
- Kingdom: Animalia
- Phylum: Chordata
- Class: Mammalia
- Order: Perissodactyla
- Family: Rhinocerotidae
- Genus: Diceros
- Species: D. bicornis

Binomial name
- Diceros bicornis (Linnaeus, 1758)

Subspecies
- Diceros bicornis bicornis †; Diceros bicornis brucii †; Diceros bicornis chobiensis Diceros bicornis ladoensis Diceros bicornis longipes †; Diceros bicornis michaeli Diceros bicornis minor Diceros bicornis occidentalis
- Historical black rhinoceros range (ca. 1700 A.D.). Hatched: Possible historical range in West Africa.
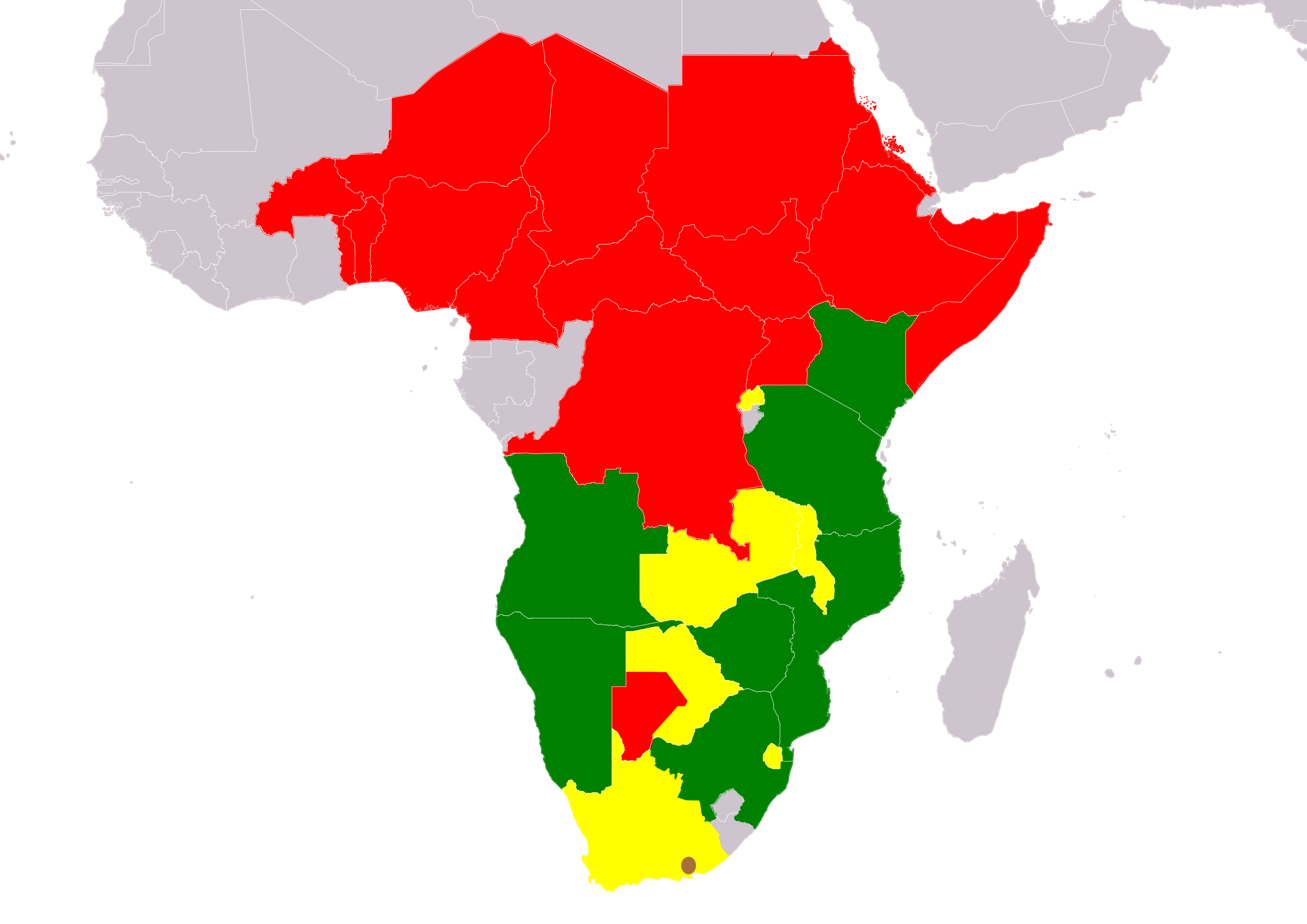
- Current black rhinoceros range Extant, resident Extinct Extant & Reintroduced (resident) Extant & Assisted Colonisation (resident)

Synonyms
- Rhinoceros bicornis Linnaeus, 1758

= Black rhinoceros =

Black rhinoceros Temporal range: Pliocene - Recent 3.6–0 Ma

Species of mammal

The black rhinoceros (Diceros bicornis), also called the black rhino or the hooked-lip rhinoceros, is a species of rhinoceros native to East and Southern Africa, including Angola, Botswana, Eswatini, Kenya, Lesotho, Malawi, Mozambique, Namibia, South Africa, Tanzania, Zambia, and Zimbabwe. Although the species is referred to as black, its colours vary from brown to grey. It is the only extant species of the genus Diceros.

The other rhinoceros native to Africa is the white rhinoceros (Ceratotherium simum). The word "white" in the name "white rhinoceros" is often said to be a misinterpretation of the Afrikaans word wyd (Dutch wijd) meaning wide, referring to its square upper lip, as opposed to the pointed or hooked lip of the black rhinoceros. These species are now sometimes referred to as the square-lipped (for white) or hook-lipped (for black) rhinoceros.

The species overall is classified as critically endangered (even though the south-western black rhinoceros is classified as near threatened) and is threatened by multiple factors including poaching and habitat reduction. Three subspecies have been declared extinct, including the western black rhinoceros, which was declared extinct by the International Union for Conservation of Nature (IUCN) in 2011. The IUCN estimates that 3,142 mature individuals remain in the wild.

== Taxonomy ==
The species was first named Rhinoceros bicornis by Carl Linnaeus in the 10th edition of his Systema naturae in 1758. The name means "double-horned rhinoceros". There is some confusion about what exactly Linnaeus conceived under this name as this species was probably based upon the skull of a single-horned Indian rhinoceros (Rhinoceros unicornis), with a second horn artificially added by the collector. Such a skull is known to have existed and Linnaeus even mentioned India as origin of this species. However he also referred to reports from early travellers about a double-horned rhino in Africa and when it emerged that there is only one, single-horned species of rhino in India, Rhinoceros bicornis was used to refer to the African rhinos (the white rhino only became recognised in 1812). In 1911 this was formally fixed and the Cape of Good Hope officially declared the type locality of the species.

=== Subspecies ===
The intraspecific variation in the black rhinoceros has been discussed by various authors and is not finally settled. The most accepted scheme considers seven or eight subspecies, of which three became extinct in historical times and one is on the brink of extinction:

- Southern black rhinoceros or Cape black rhinoceros (D. b. bicornis) – Extinct. Once abundant from the Cape of Good Hope to Transvaal, South Africa and probably into the south of Namibia, this was the largest subspecies. It became extinct due to excessive hunting and habitat destruction around 1850.
- North-eastern black rhinoceros (D. b. brucii) – Extinct. Formerly central Sudan, Eritrea, northern and southeastern Ethiopia, Djibouti and northern and southeastern Somalia. Relict populations in northern Somalia vanished during the early 20th century.
- Chobe black rhinoceros (D. b. chobiensis) – A local subspecies restricted to the Chobe Valley in southeastern Angola, Namibia (Zambezi Region) and northern Botswana. Nearly extinct, possibly only one surviving specimen in Botswana.
- Uganda black rhinoceros (D. b. ladoensis) – Former distribution from South Sudan, across Uganda into western Kenya and southwesternmost Ethiopia. Black rhinos are considered extinct across most of this area and its conservational status is unclear. Probably surviving in Kenyan reserves.
- Western black rhinoceros (D. b. longipes) – Extinct. Once lived in South Sudan, northern Central African Republic, southern Chad, northern Cameroon, northeastern Nigeria and south-eastern Niger. The range possibly stretched west to the Niger River in western Niger, though this is unconfirmed. The evidence from Liberia and Burkina Faso mainly rests upon the existence of indigenous names for the rhinoceros. A far greater former range in West Africa as proposed earlier is doubted by a 2004 study. The last known wild specimens lived in northern Cameroon. In 2006 an intensive survey across its putative range in Cameroon failed to locate any, leading to fears that it was extinct in the wild. On 10 November 2011 the IUCN declared the western black rhinoceros extinct.
- Eastern black rhinoceros (D. b. michaeli) – Had a historical distribution from South Sudan, Uganda, Ethiopia, down through Kenya into north-central Tanzania. Today, its range is limited primarily to Kenya, Rwanda and Tanzania. In addition, its population is in South Africa's Addo Elephant National Park.
- South-central black rhinoceros (D. b. minor) – Most widely distributed subspecies, characterised by a compact body, proportionally large head and prominent skin-folds. Ranged from north-eastern South Africa (KwaZulu-Natal) to northeastern Tanzania and southeastern Kenya. Preserved in reserves throughout most of its former range but probably extinct in eastern Angola, southern Democratic Republic of Congo and possibly Mozambique. It went extinct but reintroduced in Malawi, Botswana, and Zambia. It also ranges in parts of Namibia and inhabit national parks in South Africa.
- South-western black rhinoceros (D. b. occidentalis) – A small subspecies, adapted to survival in desert and semi-desert conditions. Originally distributed in north-western Namibia and southwestern Angola, today restricted to wildlife reserves in Namibia with sporadic sightings in Angola. These populations are often referred to D. b. bicornis or D. b. minor, but some experts consider them a subspecies in their own right.

The most widely adopted alternative scheme only recognizes five subspecies or "eco-types": D. b. bicornis, D. b. brucii, D. b. longipes, D. b. michaeli, and D. b. minor. This concept is also used by the IUCN, listing three surviving subspecies and recognizing D. b. brucii and D. b. longipes as extinct. The most important difference to the above scheme is the inclusion of the extant southwestern subspecies from Namibia in D. b. bicornis instead of in its own subspecies, whereupon the nominal subspecies is considered extant.

=== Evolution ===
The rhinoceros originated in the Eocene about fifty million years ago alongside other members of Perissodactyla. The last common ancestor of living rhinoceroses belonging to the subfamily Rhinocerotinae is suggested to have lived around 16 million years ago.

The white rhinoceros and black rhinoceros are more closely related to each other than to other living rhinoceroses. Rhinoceroses closely related to the black and the white rhinoceros were present in Africa by the Late Miocene about 10 million years ago, and possibly as early as 17 million years ago. The two species may have descended from the Eurasian species "Ceratotherium" neumayri, but this is disputed. A 2021 genetic analysis estimated the split between the white and black rhinoceros at around 7 million years ago. After this split, the direct ancestor of Diceros bicornis, Diceros praecox was present in the Pliocene of East Africa (Ethiopia, Kenya, Tanzania). D. bicornis is suggested to have evolved from this species during the Late Pliocene – Early Pleistocene, with the oldest definitive record at the Pliocene–Pleistocene boundary c. 2.5 million years ago at Koobi Fora, Kenya.

A cladogram showing the relationships of recent and Late Pleistocene rhinoceros species (minus Stephanorhinus hemitoechus) based on whole nuclear genomes, after Liu et al., 2021:

- - Elasmotheriinae
    †Elasmotherium sibiricum
  - Rhinocerotinae
    - - White rhinoceros (Ceratotherium simum)
      - Black rhinoceros (Diceros bicornis)
    - - - - † Woolly rhinoceros (Coelodonta antiquitatis)
          - † Merck's rhinoceros (Stephanorhinus kirchbergensis)
        - Sumatran rhinoceros (Dicerorhinus sumatrensis)
      - - Javan rhinoceros (Rhinoceros sondaicus)
        - Indian rhinoceros (Rhinoceros unicornis)

== Description ==
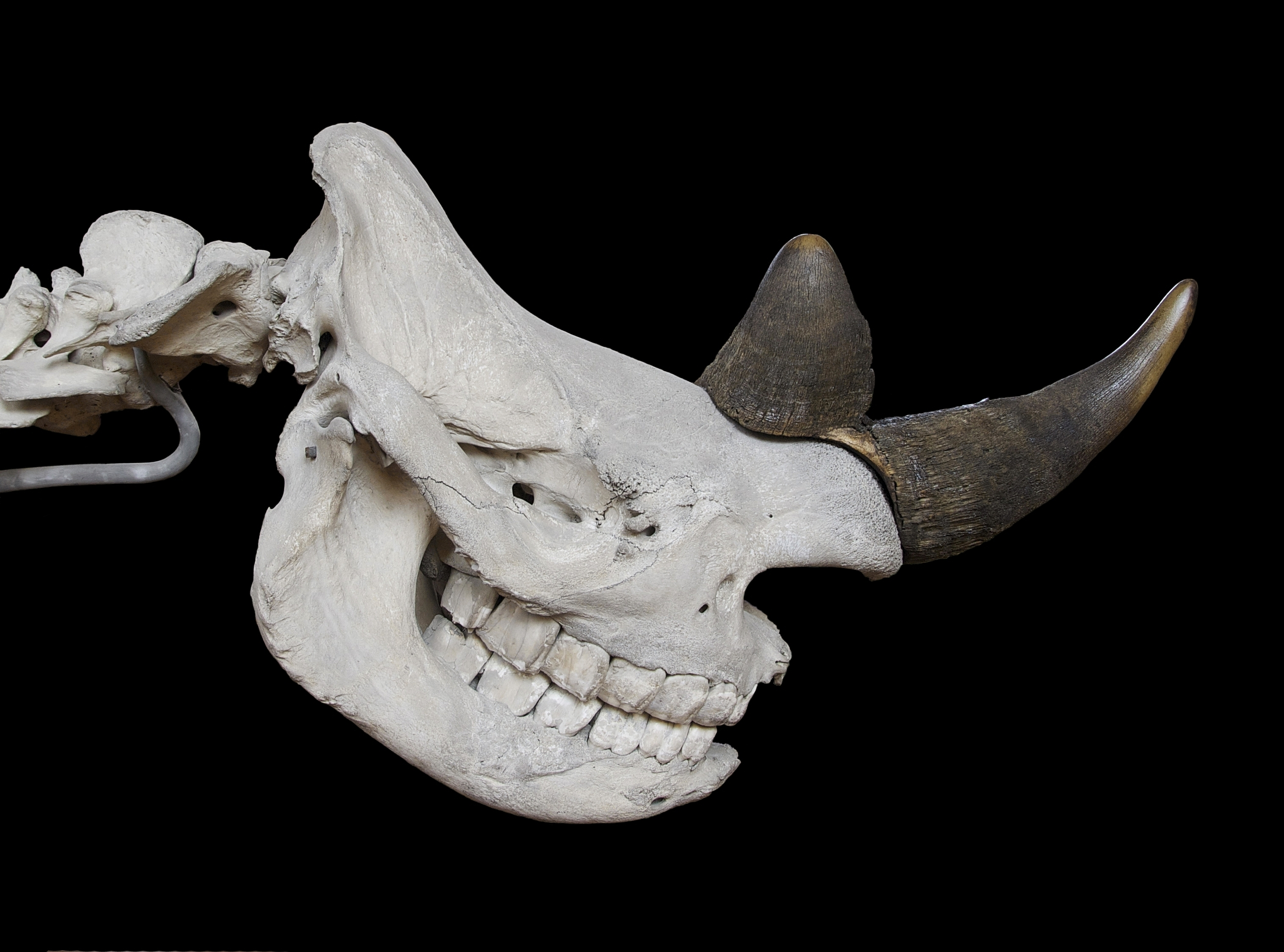
A black rhinoceros skull with restored horns

An adult black rhinoceros stands 1.32–1.8 m (4.3–5.9 ft) high at the shoulder and is 2.8–3.75 m (9.2–12.3 ft) in length. An adult typically weighs from 800 to 1,400 kg (1,800 to 3,100 lb), however unusually large male specimens have been reported at up to 2.9 t (3.2 short tons). The cows are smaller than the bulls. Two horns on the skull are made of keratin with the larger front horn typically 50 cm (1.6 ft) long, exceptionally up to 135.9 cm (4.5 ft).

The longest known black rhinoceros horn measured nearly 1.5 m (4.9 ft) in length. Sometimes a third, smaller horn may develop. These horns are used for defense, intimidation, and digging up roots and breaking branches during feeding. The black rhino is smaller than the white rhino and close in size to the Javan rhino of Indonesia. It has a pointed and prehensile upper lip, which it uses to grasp leaves and twigs when feeding, whereas the white rhinoceros has square lips used for eating grass. The black rhinoceros can also be distinguished from the white rhinoceros by its size, smaller skull, and ears; and by the position of the head, which is held higher than the white rhinoceros, since the black rhinoceros is a browser and not a grazer.

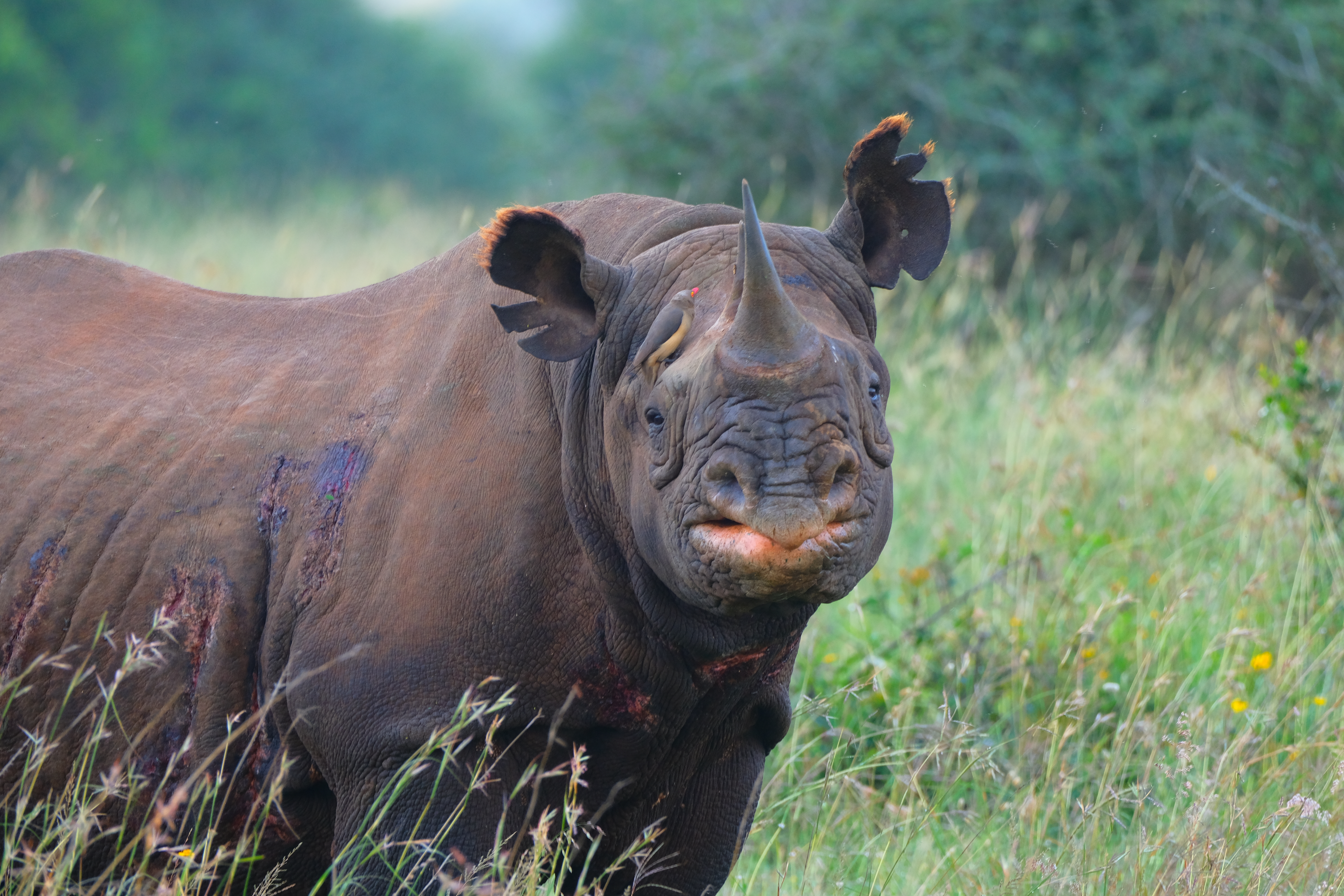
Black rhinoceros female, with a red-billed oxpecker and scratches on skin, in Nairobi National Park

Their thick-layered skin helps to protect black rhinos from thorns and sharp grasses. Their skin harbors external parasites, such as mites and ticks, which may be eaten by oxpeckers and egrets. Such behaviour was originally thought to be an example of mutualism, but recent evidence suggests that oxpeckers may be parasites instead, feeding on rhino blood. It is commonly assumed that black rhinos have poor eyesight, relying more on hearing and smell. However, studies have shown that their eyesight is comparatively good, at about the level of a rabbit. Their ears have a relatively wide rotational range to detect sounds. An excellent sense of smell alerts rhinos to the presence of predators.

== Distribution ==
Black rhino populations from 1980 to 2021

=== Prehistorical range ===
As with many other components of the African large mammal fauna, black rhinos probably had a wider range in the northern part of the continent in prehistoric times than today. However this seems to have not been as extensive as that of the white rhino. Unquestionable fossil remains have not yet been found in this area and the abundant petroglyphs found across the Sahara desert are often too schematic to unambiguously decide whether they depict black or white rhinos. Petroglyphs from the Eastern Desert of southeastern Egypt relatively convincingly show the occurrence of black rhinos in these areas in prehistoric times.

=== Historical and extant range ===
The natural range of the black rhino included most of southern and eastern Africa, except the Congo Basin, the tropical rainforest areas along the Bight of Benin, the Ethiopian Highlands, and the Horn of Africa. Its former native occurrence in the extremely dry parts of the Kalahari Desert of southwestern Botswana and northwestern South Africa is uncertain. It was abundant in an area stretching from Eritrea and Sudan through South Sudan to southeastern Niger, especially around Lake Chad. Its occurrence further to the west is questionable, although this is often claimed in literature. Today it is found only in protected nature reserves, having vanished from many countries in which it once thrived, especially in the west and north of its former range. The remaining populations are highly scattered. Some specimens have been relocated from their habitat to better protected locations, sometimes across national frontiers. The black rhino has been successfully reintroduced to Malawi since 1993, where it became extinct in 1990. Similarly it was reintroduced to Zambia (North Luangwa National Park) in 2008, where it had become extinct in 1998, and to Botswana (extinct in 1992, reintroduced in 2003).

In May 2017, 18 eastern black rhinos were translocated from South Africa to the Akagera National Park in Rwanda. The park had around 50 rhinos in the 1970s but the numbers dwindled to zero by 2007. In September 2017, the birth of a calf raised the population to 19. The park has dedicated rhino monitoring teams to protect the animals from poaching.

In October 2017, The governments of Chad and South Africa reached an agreement to transfer six black rhinos from South Africa to Zakouma National Park in Chad. Once established, this will be the northernmost population of the species. The species was wiped out from Chad in the 1970s and is under severe pressure from poaching in South Africa. The agreement calls for South African experts to assess the habitat, local management capabilities, security and the infrastructure before the transfer can take place.

== Behavior ==
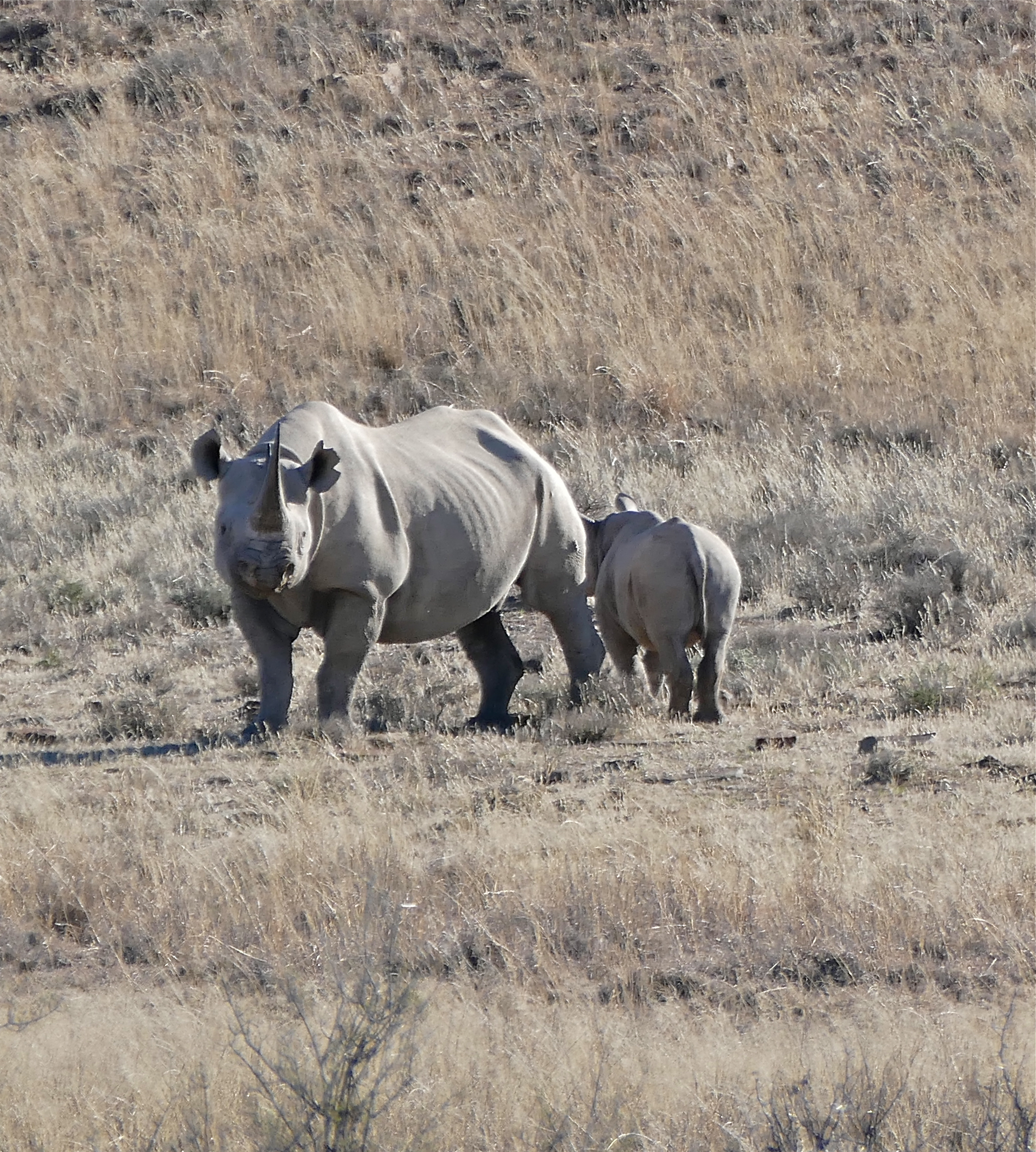
A cow with calf

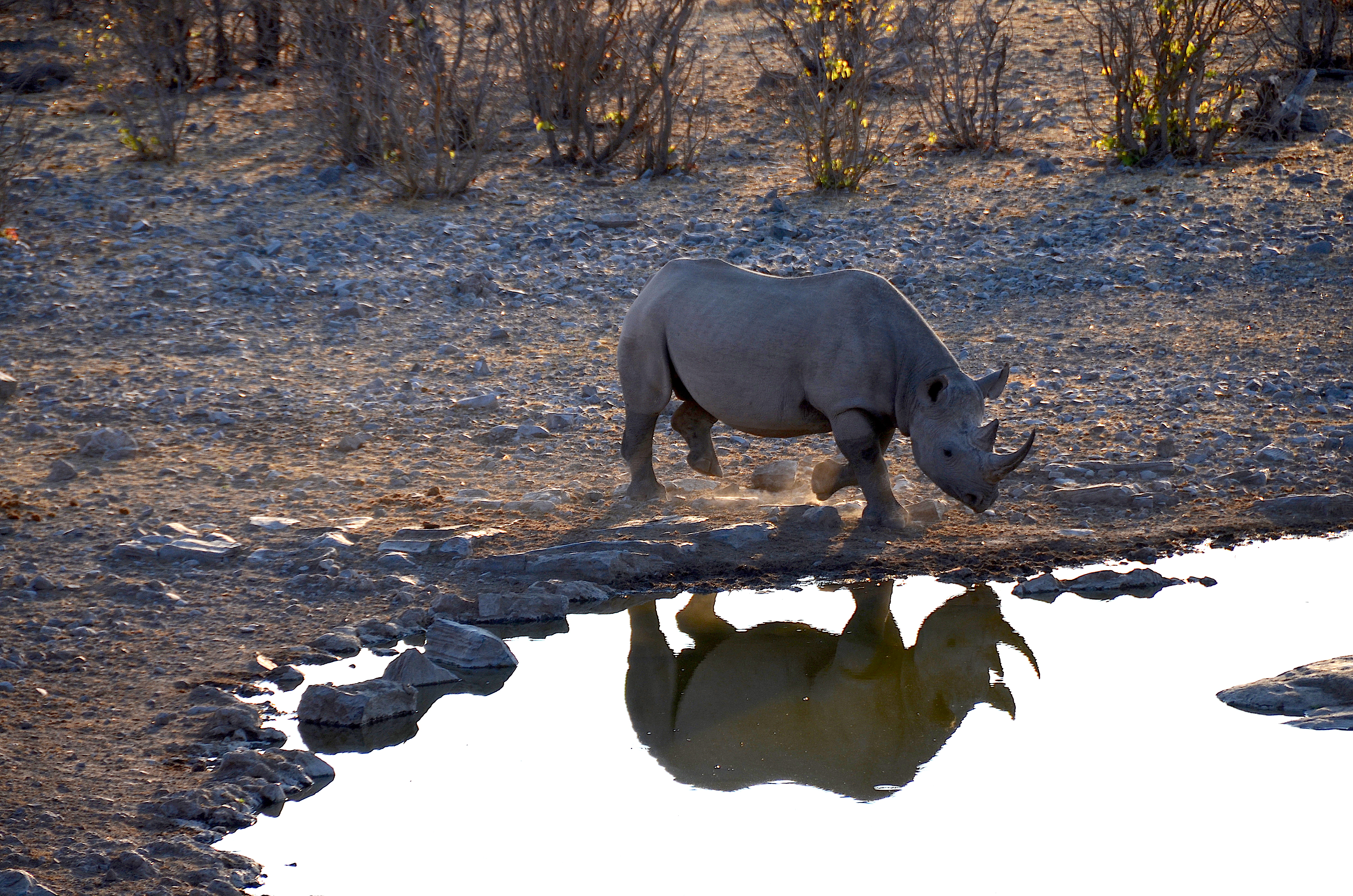
Black rhino at Moringa waterhole, Etosha National Park

Black rhinos are generally thought to be solitary, with the only strong bond between a mother and her calf. In addition, bulls and cows have a consort relationship during mating, also subadults and young adults frequently form loose associations with older individuals of either sex. They are not very territorial and often intersect other rhino territories. Home ranges vary depending on season and the availability of food and water. Generally they have smaller home ranges and larger density in habitats that have plenty of food and water available, and vice versa if resources are not readily available. Sex and age of an individual black rhino influence home range and size, with ranges of cows larger than those of bulls, especially when accompanied by a calf. In the Serengeti home ranges are around 70 to 100 km^{2} (27 to 39 sq mi), while in the Ngorongoro it is between 2.6 to 58.0 km^{2} (1.0 to 22.4 sq mi). Black rhinos have also been observed to have a certain area they tend to visit and rest frequently called "houses" which are usually on a high ground level. These "home" ranges can vary from 2.6 km^{2} to 133 km^{2} with smaller home ranges having more abundant resources than larger home ranges.

Black rhinos in captivity and reservations sleep patterns have been recently studied to show that males sleep longer on average than females by nearly double the time. Other factors that play a role in their sleeping patterns is the location of where they decide to sleep. Although they do not sleep any longer in captivity, they do sleep at different times due to their location in captivity, or section of the park.

Black rhinos have a reputation for being extremely aggressive, and charge readily at perceived threats. They have even been observed to charge tree trunks and termite mounds. Black rhinos will fight each other, and they have the highest rates of mortal combat recorded for any mammal: about 50 percent of males and 30 percent of females die from combat-related injuries. Adult rhinos normally have no natural predators, due to their imposing size, thick skin, and deadly horns. However, adult black rhinos have fallen prey to crocodiles in exceptional circumstances. Calves and, very seldom, small sub-adults may be preyed upon by lions as well.

Black rhinos follow the same trails that elephants use to get from foraging areas to water holes. They also use smaller trails when they are browsing. They are very fast and can get up to speeds of 55 kilometres per hour (34 mph) running on their toes.

While it was assumed all rhinoceros are short-sighted, a study involving black rhinoceros retinas suggests they have better eyesight than previously assumed.

=== Diet ===
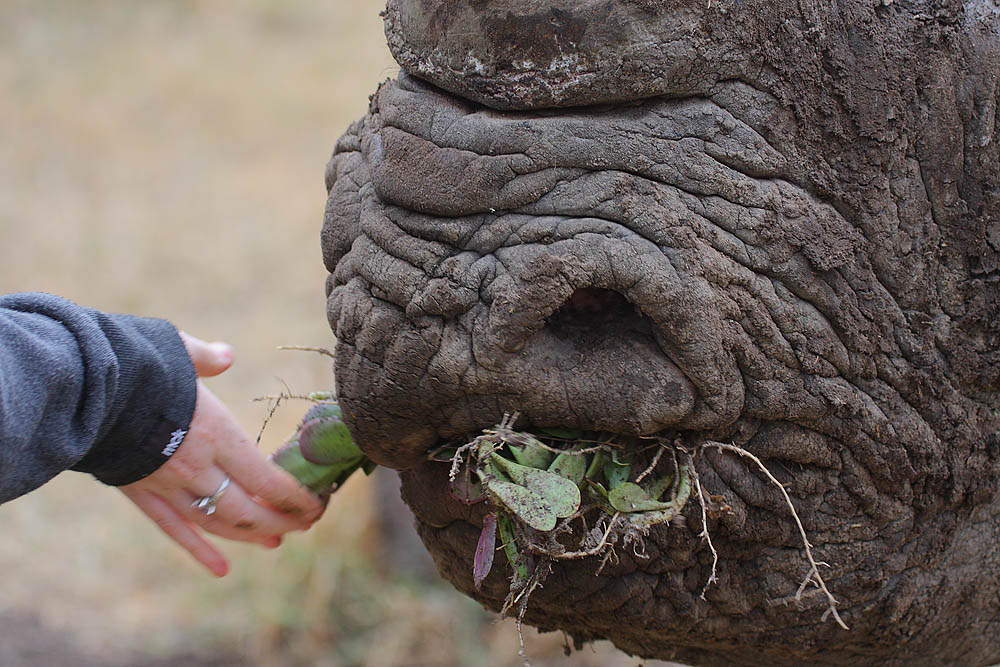
Chewing on plants

Black rhinos are herbivorous browsers that eat leafy plants, twigs, branches, shoots, thorny wood bushes, small trees, legumes, fruit, and grass. The optimum habitat seems to be one consisting of thick scrub and bushland, often with some woodland, which supports the highest densities. Their diet can reduce the number of woody plants, which may benefit grazers (who focus on leaves and stems of grass), but not competing browsers (who focus on leaves, stems of trees, shrubs or herbs). It has been known to eat up to 220 species of plants. They have a significantly restricted diet with a preference for a few key plant species and a tendency to select leafy species in the dry season. The plant species they seem to be most attracted to when not in dry season are the woody plants. There are 18 species of woody plants known to the diet of the black rhinoceros, and 11 species that could possibly be a part of their diet too. Black rhinos also have a tendency to choose food based on quality over quantity, where researchers find more populations in areas where the food has better quality. Black rhinos show a preference for Acacia species, as well as plants in the family Euphorbiaceae.

In accordance with their feeding habit, adaptations of the chewing apparatus have been described for rhinos. The black rhinoceros has a two phased chewing activity with a cutting ectoloph and more grinding lophs on the lingual side. The black rhinoceros can also be considered a more challenging herbivore to feed in captivity compared to its grazing relatives. They can live up to 5 days without water during drought. Black rhinos live in several habitats including bushlands, Riverine woodland, marshes, and their least favorable, grasslands. Habitat preferences are shown in two ways, the amount of sign found in the different habitats, and the habitat content of home ranges and core areas. Habitat types are also identified based on the composition of dominant plant types in each area. Different subspecies live in different habitats including Vachellia and Senegalia savanna, Euclea bushlands, Albany thickets, and even desert. They browse for food in the morning and evening. They are selective browsers but, studies done in Kenya show that they do add the selection material with availability in order to satisfy their nutritional requirements. In the hottest part of the day they are most inactive- resting, sleeping, and wallowing in mud. Wallowing helps cool down body temperature during the day and protects against parasites. When black rhinos browse they use their lips to strip the branches of their leaves. Competition with elephants is causing the black rhinoceros to shift its diet. The black rhinoceros alters its selectivity with the absence of the elephant.

There is some variance in the exact chemical composition of rhinoceros horns. This variation is directly linked to diet and can be used as a means of rhino identification. Horn composition has helped scientists pinpoint the original location of individual rhinos, allowing for law enforcement to more accurately and more frequently identify and penalize poachers.

=== Communication ===
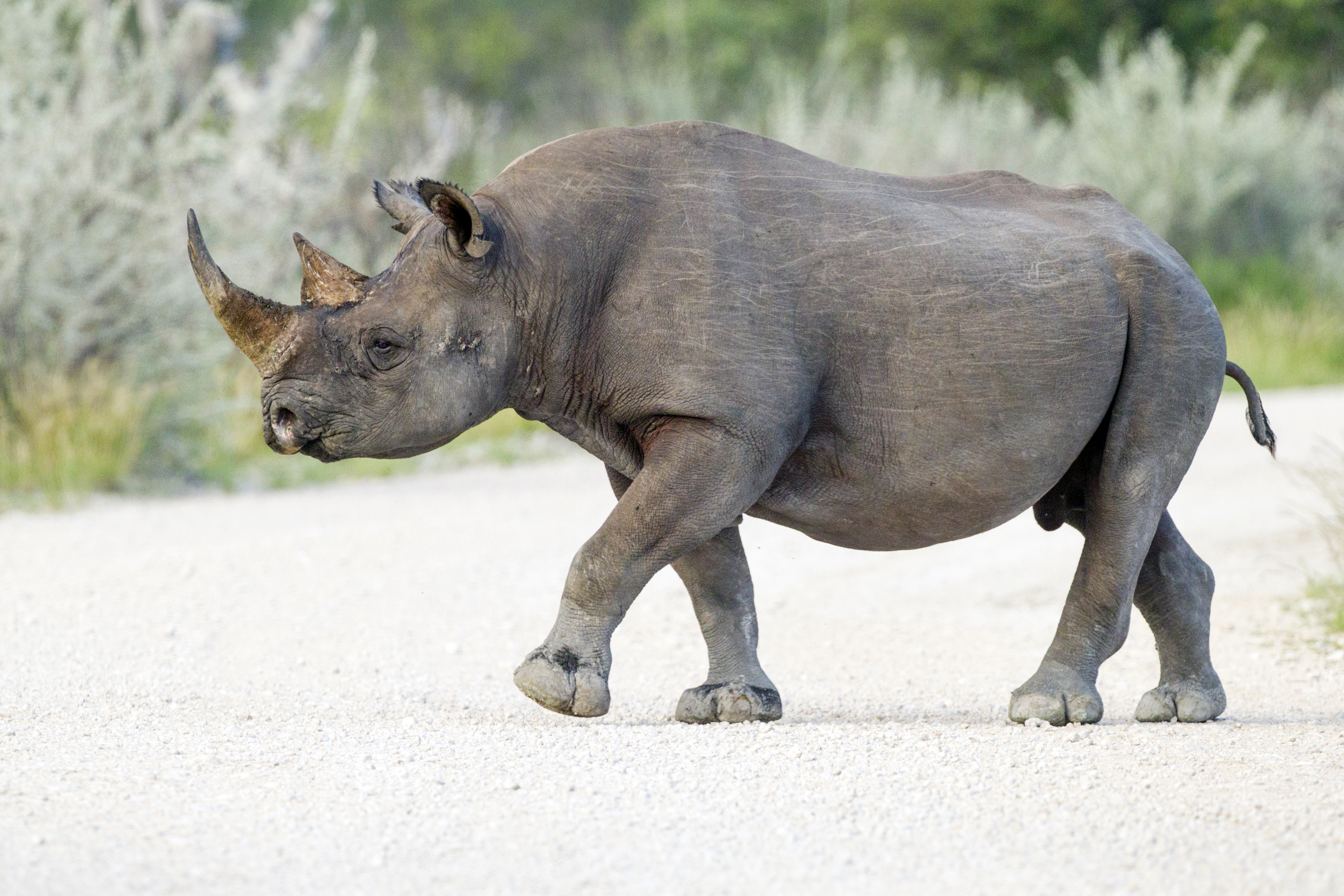
A male south-western black rhinoceros (D. b. occidentalis) in Etosha National Park, Namibia

Black rhinos use several forms of communication. Due to their solitary nature, scent marking is often used to identify themselves to other black rhinos. Urine spraying occurs on trees and bushes, around water holes and feeding areas. Cows urine spray more often when receptive for breeding. Defecation sometimes occurs in the same spot used by different black rhinos, such as around feeding stations and watering tracks. Coming upon these spots, rhinos will smell to see who is in the area and add their own marking. When presented with adult feces, bulls and cows respond differently than when they are presented with subadult feces. The urine and feces of one black rhinoceros helps other black rhinoceroses to determine its age, sex, and identity. Less commonly they will rub their heads or horns against tree trunks to scent-mark.

The black rhino has powerful tube-shaped ears that can freely rotate in all directions. This highly developed sense of hearing allows black rhinos to detect sound over vast distances.

=== Reproduction ===
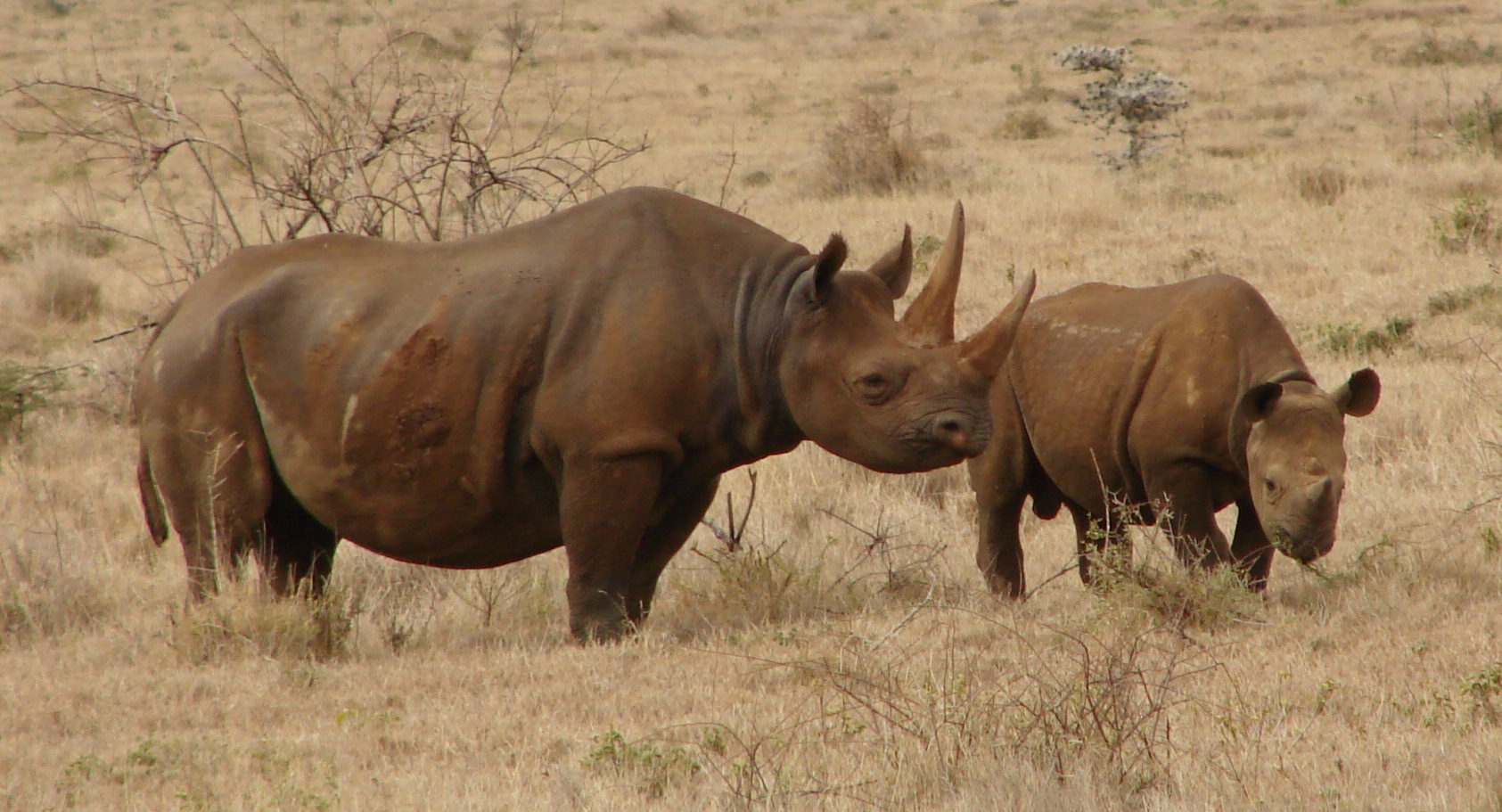
Mother and calf in Lewa, central Kenya

The adults are solitary in nature, coming together only for mating. Mating does not have a seasonal pattern but births tend to be towards the end of the rainy season in more arid environments.

When in season the cows will mark dung piles. Bulls will follow cows when they are in season; when she defecates he will scrape and spread the dung, making it more difficult for rival adult bulls to pick up her scent trail.

Courtship behaviors before mating include snorting and sparring with the horns among males. Another courtship behavior is called bluff and bluster, where the black rhino will snort and swing its head from side to side aggressively before running away repeatedly. Breeding pairs stay together for 2–3 days and sometimes even weeks. They mate several times a day over this time and copulation lasts for a half-hour, or even longer than one hour.

The gestation period for a black rhino is 15 months. The single calf weighs about 35–50 kilograms (80–110 lb) at birth, and can follow its mother around after just three days. Weaning occurs at around 2 years of age for the offspring. The mother and calf stay together for 2–3 years until the next calf is born; female calves may stay longer, forming small groups. The young are occasionally taken by hyenas and lions. Sexual maturity is reached from 5 to 7 years old for females, and 7 to 8 years for males. The life expectancy in natural conditions (without poaching pressure) is from 35 to 50 years. The oldest living Black rhinoceros was Fausta, who lived to be 57 years old.

== Conservation ==
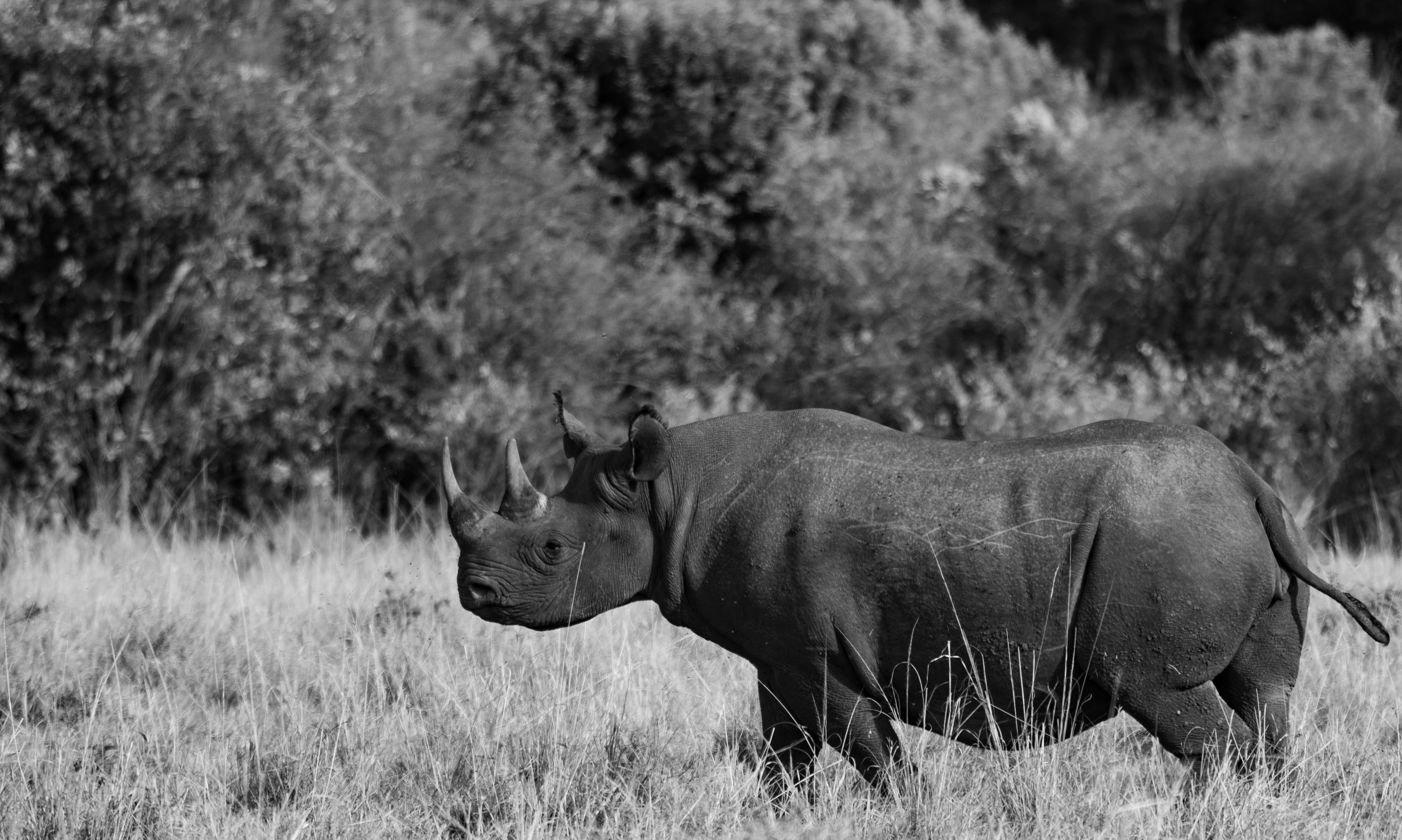
Black rhino in the Maasai Mara

For most of the 20th century the continental black rhino was the most numerous of all rhino species. Around 1900 there were probably several hundred thousand living in Africa. During the latter half of the 20th century their numbers were severely reduced from an estimated 70,000 in the late 1960s to only 10,000 to 15,000 in 1981. In the early 1990s the number dipped below 2,500, and in 2004 it was reported that only 2,410 black rhinos remained. According to the International Rhino Foundation—housed in Yulee, Florida, at White Oak Conservation, which breeds black rhinos—the total African population had recovered to 4,240 by 2008 (which suggests that the 2004 number was low). By 2009 the population of 5,500 was either steady or slowly increasing.

In 1992, nine black rhinos were brought from Chete National Park, Zimbabwe to Australia via Cocos Island. After the natural deaths of the males in the group, four males were brought in from United States and have since adapted well to captivity and new climate. Calves and some subadults are preyed on by lions, but predation is rarely taken into account in managing the black rhinoceros. This is a major flaw because predation should be considered when attributing cause to the poor performance of the black rhinoceros population. In 2002 only ten western black rhinos remained in Cameroon, and in 2006 intensive surveys across its putative range failed to locate any, leading to fears that this subspecies had become extinct. In 2011 the IUCN declared the western black rhino extinct. There was a conservation effort in which black rhinos were translocated, but their population did not improve, as they did not like to be in an unfamiliar habitat.

Under CITES Appendix I all international commercial trade of the black rhino horn is prohibited since 1977. China though having joined CITES since 8 April 1981 is the largest importer of black rhino horns. However, this is a trade in which not only do the actors benefit, but so do the nation states ignoring them as well. Nevertheless, people continue to remove the rhino from its natural environment and allow for a dependence on human beings to save them from endangerment. Parks and reserves have been made for protecting the rhinos with armed guards keeping watch, but even still many poachers get through and harm the rhinos for their horns. Many have considered extracting rhino horns in order to deter poachers from slaughtering these animals or potentially bringing them to other breeding grounds such as the US and Australia. This method of extracting the horn, known as dehorning, consists of tranquilizing the rhino then sawing the horn almost completely off to decrease initiative for poaching, although the effectiveness of this in reducing poaching is not known and rhino mothers are known to use their horns to fend off predators.

The only rhino subspecies that has recovered somewhat from the brink of extinction is the southern white rhinoceros, whose numbers now are estimated around 14,500, up from fewer than 50 in the first decade of the 20th century. But there seems to be hope for the black rhinoceros in recovering their gametes from dead rhinos in captivity. This shows promising results for producing black rhinoceros embryos, which can be used for testing sperm in vitro.

A January 2014 auction for a permit to hunt a black rhinoceros in Namibia sold for $350,000 at a fundraiser hosted by the Dallas Safari Club. The auction drew considerable criticism as well as death threats directed towards members of the club and the man who purchased the permit. This permit was issued for 1 of 18 black rhinoceros specifically identified by Namibia's Ministry of Environment and Tourism as being past breeding age and considered a threat to younger rhinos. The $350,000 that the hunter paid for the permit was used by the Namibian government to fund anti-poaching efforts in the country.

In 2022 South Africa granted permits to hunt 10 black rhinos, stating that the population is growing.

== Threats ==
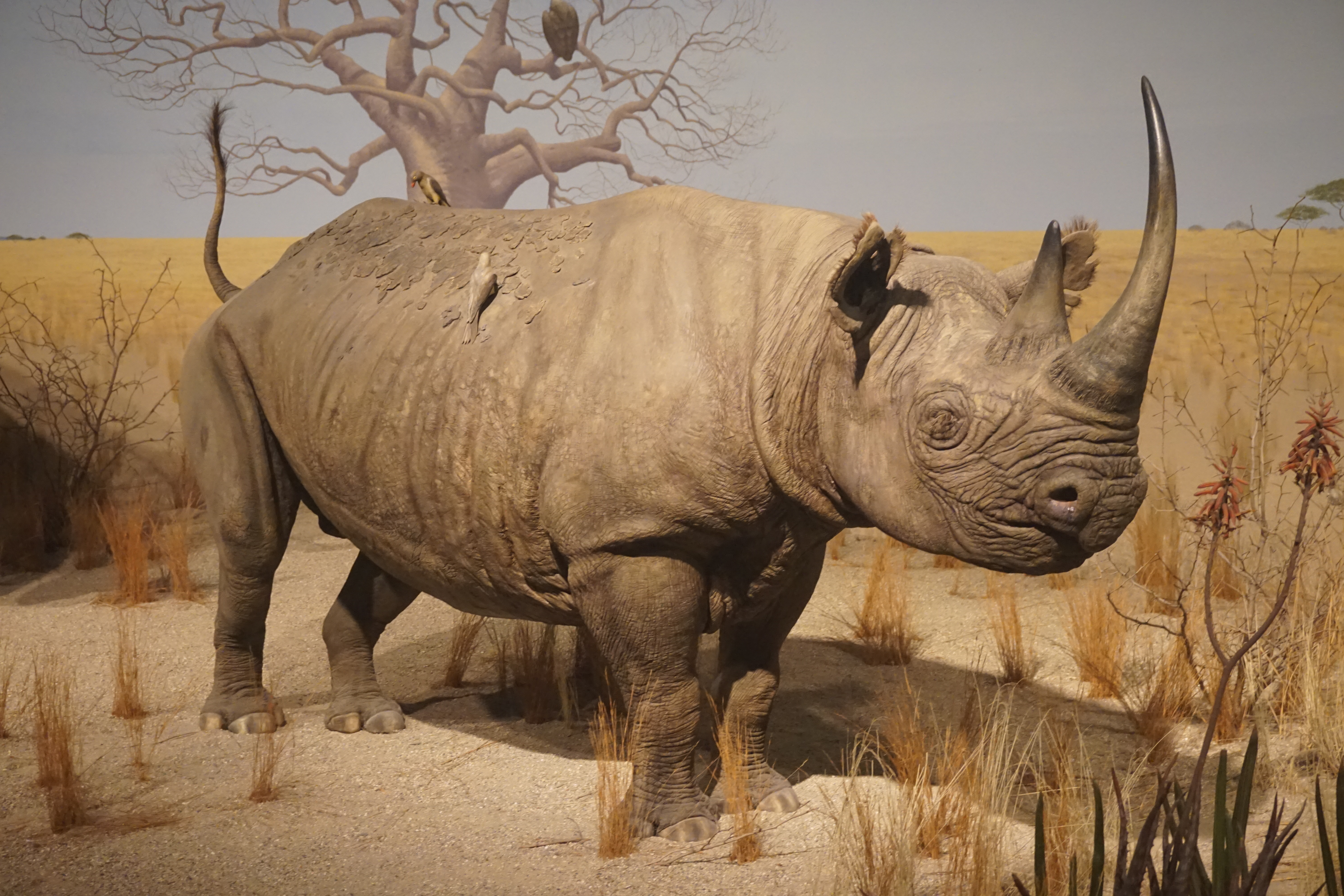
A black rhinoceros in the Savanna Bush diorama at the Milwaukee Public Museum

Today, there are various threats posed to black rhinos including habitat changes, illegal poaching, and competing species. Civil disturbances, such as war, have made mentionably negative effects on the black rhinoceros populations in since the 1960s in countries including, but not limited to, Chad, Cameroon, Rwanda, Mozambique, and Somalia. In the Addo Elephant National Park in South Africa, the African bush elephant (Loxodonta africana) is posing slight concern involving the black rhinoceroses who also inhabit the area. Both animals are browsers; however, the elephant's diet consists of a wider variety of foraging capacity, while the black rhinoceros primarily sticks to dwarf shrubs. The black rhinoceros has been found to eat grass as well; however, the shortening of its range of available food could be potentially problematic.

Black rhinos face problems associated with the minerals they ingest. They have become adjusted to ingesting less iron in the wild due to their evolutionary progression, which poses a problem when placed in captivity. These rhinoceroses can overload on iron, which leads to build up in the lungs, liver, spleen and small intestine. Not only do these rhinoceros face threats being in the wild, but in captivity too. Black rhinoceros have become more susceptible to disease in captivity with high rates of mortality.

Illegal poaching for the international rhino horn trade is the main and most detrimental threat. The killing of these animals is not unique to modern-day society. The Chinese have maintained reliable documents of these happenings dating back to 1200 B.C. The ancient Chinese often hunted rhino horn for the making of wine cups, as well as the rhino's skin to manufacture imperial crowns, belts and armor for soldiers. A major market for rhino horn has historically been in the Middle East nations to make ornately carved handles for ceremonial daggers called jambiyas. Demand for these exploded in the 1970s, causing the black rhinoceros population to decline 96% between 1970 and 1992. The horn is also used in traditional Chinese medicine, and is said by herbalists to be able to revive comatose patients, facilitate exorcisms and various methods of detoxification, and cure fevers. It is also hunted for the Chinese superstitious belief that the horns allow direct access to Heaven due to their unique location and hollow nature. The purported effectiveness of the use of rhino horn in treating any illness has not been confirmed, or even suggested, by medical science. In June 2007, the first-ever documented case of the medicinal sale of black rhino horn in the United States (confirmed by genetic testing of the confiscated horn) occurred at a traditional Chinese medicine supply store in Portland, Oregon's Chinatown.
