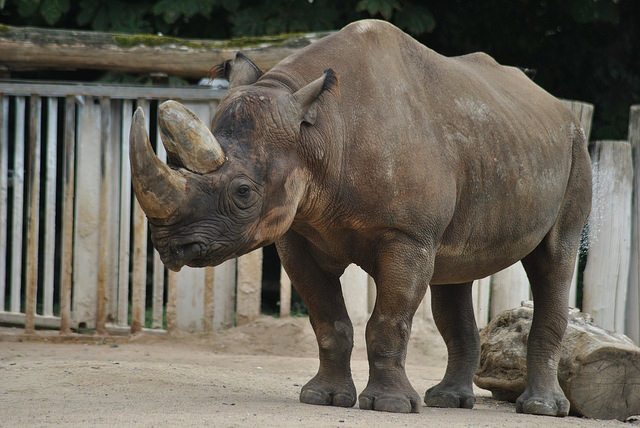
- South-central black rhinoceros at Frankfurt Zoo, Germany

Conservation status
- Critically Endangered (IUCN 3.1)

Scientific classification
- Kingdom: Animalia
- Phylum: Chordata
- Class: Mammalia
- Order: Perissodactyla
- Family: Rhinocerotidae
- Genus: Diceros
- Species: D. bicornis
- Subspecies: D. b. minor

Trinomial name
- Diceros bicornis minor (Drummond, 1876)

= South-central black rhinoceros =

Subspecies of rhino

The south-central black rhinoceros (Diceros bicornis minor), also known as the south-central hook-lipped rhinoceros or the lesser black rhino, is a subspecies of the black rhinoceros. In keeping with the rules of zoological nomenclature, the south-central black rhinoceros should be known as Diceros bicornis keitloa (Smith, 1836), a nomen novum. Although it is the most numerous of the black rhinoceros subspecies, it is nevertheless designated as critically endangered on the IUCN Red List. Like other black rhinoceros subspecies, it has a prehensile lip and lives in savanna habitat.

== Range ==
The south-central black rhinoceros once ranged from western and southern Tanzania, through Malawi, Zambia, Zimbabwe, and Mozambique, all the way to northern and eastern South Africa. It is also thought to have inhabited the southern part of the Democratic Republic of the Congo, as well as northern Angola and eastern Botswana. Today, however, its population stronghold is in northeastern South Africa, Namibia and to a lesser extent in Zimbabwe, with even smaller numbers in Eswatini's Mkhaya Game Reserve. At one time, the south-central black rhino had disappeared from Malawi, Botswana, and Zambia, but it has since been reintroduced into those countries. Whether there are any in Mozambique is uncertain, but at least one specimen has been seen there since 2008.

== Population and threats ==
Over the last 50 years, the south-central black rhinoceros population has declined by 90%. It was at 9,090 in 1980, but by 1995, due to a wave of illegal poaching for their horns, their numbers had decreased to 1,300. Their population then began to rebound somewhat. By 2001, it had increased to 1,651, and by 2010 it was about 2,200 (with 2,196 in Namibia, 1,684 of these in South Africa, 938 in Kenya, 431 in Zimbabwe, 212 in Tanzania, 58 in Zambia, 56 in Malawi, 48 in Eswatini, 28 in Rwanda, and 23 in Botswana. Only seven black rhinos remain in Chad and two remain in Mozambique). At present the number is increasing overall, but decreasing regionally (in Zimbabwe). The main threat to the subspecies is illegal poaching, which has increased in recent years.
