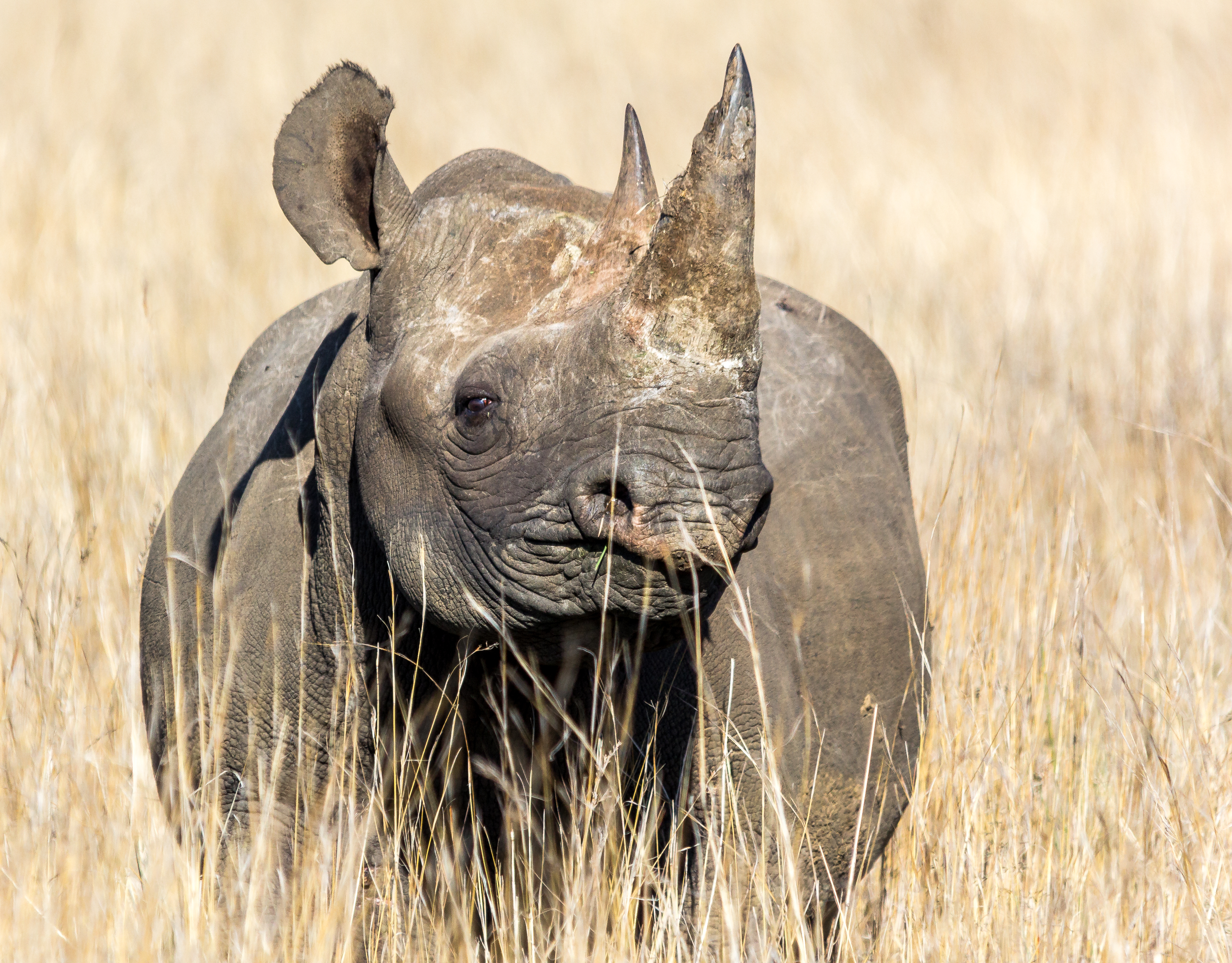
- Black rhinoceros (Diceros bicornis)

Scientific classification
- Kingdom: Animalia
- Phylum: Chordata
- Class: Mammalia
- Infraclass: Placentalia
- Order: Perissodactyla
- Family: Rhinocerotidae
- Tribe: Dicerotini
- Genus: Diceros; Gray, 1821

Species
- Diceros bicornis; †Diceros australis?; †Diceros praecox; †Diceros douariensis; †Diceros gansuensis; †Diceros primaevus

= Diceros =

Diceros Temporal range: Late Miocene–Holocene Possible Early Miocene record

Genus of Rhinocerotidae

Diceros is a genus of rhinoceros containing the extant black rhinoceros (Diceros bicornis) and several extinct species.

== Taxonomy ==
Diceros is more closely related to the genus Ceratotherium (which contains the white rhinoceros) than it is to other living rhinoceroses, with the clade containing the two comprising the tribe Dicerotini (also spelled Diceroti) or subtribe Dicerotina.

Diceros has been suggested by some authors to have branched off from an early species of Ceratotherium, specifically C. neumayri, which has also been assigned to Diceros in some studies. However, other authors have disputed the close relationship between Diceros and "C". neumayri.

The oldest species assigned to the genus is "Diceros" australis from the Early Miocene of Namibia, dating to around 17-18 million years ago. It is only known from fragmentary remains, and its assignment to the genus, and even to Dicerotini have been questioned by other authors. Other species assigned to the genus include Diceros praecox from the Late Miocene (from about 7 million years ago) and the Pliocene of Sub-Saharan Africa. D. praecox has been suggested by some authors to be the ancestor of the modern D. bicornis. Diceros primaevus is known from the Late Miocene (c. 12-10 million years ago) of Algeria. Diceros douariensis is known from the Late Miocene of Tunisia and possibly Ethiopia. Some authors have assigned this species to Ceratotherium. The species Diceros gansuensis has been reported from the Late Miocene of China, dating to around 10 million years ago. The earliest remains assigned to the modern black rhinoceros are known the Late Miocene (around 7 million years ago) of East Africa, though other authors have considered the earliest remains of the species to date to the earliest Pleistocene around 2.6 million years ago at Koobi Fora, Kenya.
