= List of African species extinct in the Holocene =

Animal extinctions in the African continent since 9700 BCE

Map of Africa

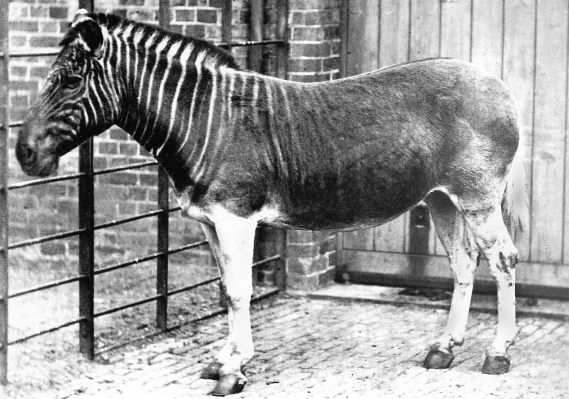
The quagga (Equus quagga quagga), extinct since 1883, was striped in the front but with a plain brown coat in the rear. A breeding program aims to create similar-looking animals, but these are not true quaggas.

This list of African species extinct in the Holocene covers extinctions from the Holocene epoch, a geologic epoch that began about 11,650 years before present (about 9700 BCE) (Note: The source gives "11,700 calendar yr b2k (before CE 2000)". But "BP" means "before CE 1950". Therefore, the Holocene began 11,650 BP. Doing the math, that is c. 9700 BCE.) and continues to the present.

Africa is highly biodiverse; it is the continent with the largest number of megafauna species, as it was least affected by the extinction of the Pleistocene megafauna. However, a few species have disappeared from Africa as part of the ongoing Holocene extinction, driven by human activity.

Madagascar and the Indian Ocean islands, Macaronesia, and Saint Helena, Ascension and Tristan da Cunha are biogeographically distinct from mainland Africa and have a much greater number of Holocene extinctions. Recently extinct species from these regions are listed in separate articles.

Many extinction dates are unknown due to a lack of relevant information.

== Mammals (class Mammalia) ==
=== Elephant-like mammals (order Proboscidea) ===
==== Elephants and mammoths (family Elephantidae) ====
| Common name | Scientific name | Range | Comments | Pictures |
|---|---|---|---|---|
| North African elephant | Loxodonta africana pharaoensis | North Africa | Neolithic rock art indicates that the African bush elephant inhabited much of the Sahara desert and North Africa at the beginning of the Holocene, and Ancient authors wrote that it was present in the Atlas Mountains, the Red Sea coast, and Nubia until the first few centuries CE. It was also present in much of Egypt, except for the Sinai Peninsula, during the Late Paleolithic or early Holocene. However the validity of separate subspecies in Loxodonta africana has been called into question, including the purported North African subspecies L. a. pharaoensis. Ptolemy II Philadelphus (r. 284-246 BC) founded the cities of Berenice Troglodytica and Ptolemais Theron as hunting bases to provide himself with African raw ivory and war elephants, replacing the costlier imports from India. This caused the depletion of elephant populations along the Red Sea coast and northern Somalia in less than two or three decades. These "Eritrean" elephants were at one point identified as African forest elephants due to Polybius's claim that they were smaller than the Asian elephants they faced at the Battle of Raphia, but genetic analyses show they were bush elephants. In the Roman Empire, the Maghreb and possibly Western Africa through the Garamantes became additional sources of ivory and live elephants for the circus games. The last clear mention of wild elephants in the former is a speech of the orator Themistius delivered in 370 CE, where he mentions that "elephants have been removed from Libya". (Note: "...and we are displeased because elephants have been removed from Libya, because lions have disappeared from Thessaly, because hippopotamoi have been gotten rid from the marshes of the Nile.") | |

=== Rodents (order Rodentia) ===
==== Old World rats and mice (family Muridae) ====
===== Possibly extinct =====
| Common name | Scientific name | Range | Comments |
|---|---|---|---|
| Togo mouse | Leimacomys buettneri | Adele, Togo and possibly Ghana | Last collected in 1890. Natives of Shiare, Ghana and the Kyabobo Range National Park in Togo identified photographs of museum specimens as an animal called "yefuli" in the 1990s. |

=== Primates (order Primates) ===
==== Lorises, pottos, and angwantibos (family Lorisidae) ====
===== Possibly extinct =====
| Common name | Scientific name | Range | Comments |
|---|---|---|---|
| Mount Kenya potto | Perodicticus ibeanus stockleyi | Mount Kenya, Kenya | Known from a single specimen collected from montane forest in 1938. |

==== Old world monkeys (family Cercopithecidae) ====
===== Possibly extinct =====
| Common name | Scientific name | Range | Comments |
|---|---|---|---|
| Miss Waldron's red colobus | Piliocolobus waldronae | Rainforests of Ghana and Ivory Coast | Last observed in 1978. A skin was found in possession of a hunter in 2002 and possible calls were heard by researchers in 2008. In addition to hunting, the species's range has been largely deforested since the 1970s for logging, charcoal production, and agricultural use. |

=== True insectivores (order Eulipotyphla) ===
==== True shrews (family Soricidae) ====
| Common name | Scientific name | Range | Comments |
|---|---|---|---|
| Balsam shrew | Crocidura balsamifera | Lower Nile, Egypt | Described from mummified remains from Ancient Egypt dating to 821-171 BCE. Presumed to have been a swamp or gallery forest specialist whose natural habitat was cleared for agriculture. |

===== Locally extinct =====
| Common name | Scientific name | Range | Comments |
|---|---|---|---|
| Güldenstädt's shrew | Crocidura gueldenstaedtii | Southern Europe and Western Asia | Mummified remains from the beginning of the Ptolemaic Period at Quesna, Egypt indicate that it once occurred in the Nile Delta, where it no longer does, supporting a moister regional environment at the time. |

=== Carnivorans (order Carnivora) ===
==== Cats (family Felidae) ====
===== Locally extinct =====
| Common name | Scientific name | Range | Comments | Pictures |
|---|---|---|---|---|
| Cape lion | Population of the southern lion (Panthera leo melanochaita) | South Africa | Last individual was killed in KwaZulu-Natal in 1865. Though widely recognized as a subspecies since being named in 1842, modern molecular studies indicate that there is not enough difference with extant lions of southern and eastern Africa to warrant separate subspecies status, and as a result the taxon P. l. melanochaita is not extinct. | |
| Barbary leopard | Population of the African leopard (Panthera pardus pardus) | Atlas Mountains | Last recorded in 1996. Though named as the subspecies P. p. panthera in 1777, it was later included in P. p. pardus on morphological and molecular grounds. | |
| Zanzibar leopard | Population of the African leopard (Panthera pardus pardus) | Unguja, Tanzania | Only African insular population of leopards. Subjected to an extermination campaign after the Zanzibar Revolution of 1964, the last confirmed sighting happened in 1986. Though named as the subspecies P. p. adersi in 1932, it was included in the African leopard P. p. pardus in 1996 on morphological grounds. There was an unconfirmed recording of a leopard in Unguja in 2018. | |

===== Extinct in the wild =====
| Common name | Scientific name | Range | Comments | Pictures |
|---|---|---|---|---|
| Barbary lion | Population of the northern lion (Panthera leo leo) | North Africa | Lions existed throughout Egypt in ancient times. The last recorded lion in Libya was killed in 1700, in Tunisia in 1891, in Morocco in 1942 (on the Tizi-N'Tichka pass of the High Atlas), and in Algeria in 1943, though there was an unconfirmed sighting of a lion by the passengers of a bus in a remote wooded area of the Béni Ourtilane District in 1956. Despite being the first subspecies named by Linnaeus in the 18th century, modern molecular studies indicate that there is not enough difference with the lions of India, western and central Africa to warrant separate subspecies status, and as a result the taxon P. l. leo is not extinct. Descendants of this population exist in Rabat Zoo, but these individuals are genetically impure. | |

==== Dogs (family Canidae) ====
===== Locally extinct =====
| Common name | Scientific name | Range | Comments | Pictures |
|---|---|---|---|---|
| Gray wolf | Canis lupus | Eurasia and North America | Lived in the Nile Delta in prehistoric times. The African wolf has considerable genetic admixture from the gray wolf. | |

==== Bears (family Ursidae) ====
| Common name | Scientific name | Range | Comments | Pictures |
|---|---|---|---|---|
| Atlas bear | Ursus arctos crowtheri | Northern Maghreb | This subspecies was named after the second-hand description of a female killed in the Rif near Tétouan in 1834 and its pelt, which is now lost. The presence of brown bears in Morocco and Algeria was confirmed with the finding of several bones ranging from the Pleistocene to 662-778 CE, mostly in high mountains around 1200–2000 meters above sea level. Bears were of similar size to the small southern populations of Spain, Italy, and the Middle East. Native knowledge of bears was also documented in Algeria in the 18th century and the beginning of the 19th century. mtDNA studies revealed that two highly distinct lineages of bears existed in North Africa through the Holocene: one identical to Cantabrian brown bears from Spain, and another that was basal to all European brown bears. (Note: This study did not use Syrian brown bears for comparison.) The North African bear could have disappeared due to increased habitat fragmentation. | |

===== Locally extinct =====
| Common name | Scientific name | Range | Comments | Pictures |
|---|---|---|---|---|
| Syrian bear | Ursus arctos syriacus | Near East | Lived in the Nile Delta in prehistoric times and possibly in northeastern Egypt in early historical times. | |

=== Odd-toed ungulates (order Perissodactyla) ===
==== Horses, asses, and zebras (family Equidae) ====
| Common name | Scientific name | Range | Comments | Pictures |
|---|---|---|---|---|
| Atlas wild ass | Equus africanus atlanticus | North Africa | Disappeared around 300 CE. This subspecies is attributed a distribution in the Atlas region of northern Morocco, Algeria, and Tunisia, although E. africanus is also known from the Holocene of the Sahara, Egypt, and Arabia, excluding the extant subspecies E. a. africanus and E. a. somaliensis from Sudan and the Horn of Africa. North African rock art and Roman mosaics show animals with characteristic leg stripes and a shoulder stripe, often doubled, different from the extant subspecies. However, it has been claimed that the name E. a. atlanticus would be unavailable due to improper description of a type specimen. Domestic donkeys have two different haplotypes, one shared with the Nubian wild ass, and another of unknown origin that is not found in the Somali wild ass. The presence of the Atlas wild ass in the ancient world makes it a plausible source for the second haplotype. | |
| North African horse | Equus algericus | North Africa | Most recent remains dated to 4855–4733 BCE at El Harhoura 1, Morocco. | |
| Giant Cape zebra | Equus capensis | Southern Africa | Most recent remains at Wonderwerk Cave, South Africa were dated to 8120-7980 BCE. Described as the largest equid of the African Quaternary and an extreme hypsodont, its extinction is speculated to be related to the decline in the availability or productivity of grassland habitats since the end of the Last Glacial Maximum. However, ancient DNA studies indicate that the giant Cape zebra is not a separate species, but a distinct lineage of the plains zebra (E. quagga). | |
| North African zebra | Equus mauritanicus | North Africa | Related to the plains zebra. Disappeared c. 4000 BCE. | |
| | Equus melkiensis | Northern Algeria and Morocco | Disappeared c. 4000 BCE. Related to the African wild ass and sometimes considered the same as E. a. atlanticus. | |
| Quagga | Equus quagga quagga | Cape Province, South Africa | Last seen in the wild between 1860 and 1865 due to overhunting and competition from introduced livestock such as sheep and goats. The last individual died in captivity at Artis, Amsterdam in 1883. Since the 1980s, the Quagga Project has selectively bred plains zebras to recreate the coloration of the extinct subspecies. However, the animals produced by the project would not be considered members of the same subspecies due to only sharing its phenotype, and not the original genotype. | |

===== Possibly extinct =====
| Common name | Scientific name | Range | Comments | Pictures |
|---|---|---|---|---|
| Nubian wild ass | Equus africanus africanus | Nubian Desert | Considered possibly extinct as it has only been infrequently seen since it was sighted in Ethiopia's Barka Valley and Eritrea during the 1970s. The subspecies is threatened by hunting for food and traditional medicine, competition with livestock for vegetation and water, and possibly interbreeding with domestic donkeys. Some haplotypes in domestic donkeys are also found in the Nubian wild ass, either suggesting that domestic donkeys are partially descended from the Nubian wild ass, or that there has been interbreeding between Nubian wild asses and feral donkeys. | |

==== Rhinoceroses (family Rhinocerotidae) ====
| Common name | Scientific name | Range | Comments | Pictures |
|---|---|---|---|---|
| | Ceratotherium mauritanicum | Northern and eastern Africa | Though more known from the Pliocene and Pleistocene, it survived into the early Holocene of Morocco and Tunisia and is commonly depicted in North African rock art hunting scenes up to the Bronze Age. It was extremely similar to the northern white rhinoceros C. simum cottoni in size, proportions, and dentition, and has been treated as its direct ancestor, a subspecies (though cottoni is now recognized as a subspecies of C. simum itself), or synonymous with it. | |
| Southern black rhinoceros | Diceros bicornis bicornis | Southwestern Africa | Disappeared from the Cape Colony in the mid-19th century. The IUCN considers the south-western black rhinoceros (D. b. occidentalis) from Namibia and Angola, used to re-stock South Africa, to be the same subspecies. If this is followed, the taxon D. b. bicornis is not extinct. | |
| Western black rhinoceros | Diceros bicornis longipes | Burkina Faso to South Sudan | An investigation into the last known location in Cameroon in 2006 found abundant evidence of wildlife poaching and no sign of rhinoceroses except that faked by local rhinoceros monitors. There have been no sightings or other evidence afterward. | |
| North-eastern black rhinoceros | Diceros bicornis brucii | Horn of Africa to eastern Sudan and Bahr el Ghazal | Extinct by the early 20th century due to overhunting and habitat loss | |

===== Possibly extinct in the wild =====
| Common name | Scientific name | Range | Comments | Pictures |
|---|---|---|---|---|
| Northern white rhinoceros | Ceratotherium simum cottoni | Upper Chari, Ubangi, and White Nile river basins | The last four wild animals were sighted in 2006 and the last indirect sign of their presence was detected in 2007, both under an uptick of poaching in the region. In 2009, the last four captive rhinos were moved from the Safari Park Dvůr Králové in the Czech Republic to Ol Pejeta Conservancy in Kenya, outside of the subspecies' known range. In 2018, the final known male individual, Sudan was euthanised due to his deteriorating health, making the subspecies functionally extinct. The last remaining individuals, Najin and Fatu are both incapable of giving birth. There are ongoing efforts to save the subspecies through in-vitro fertilisation. An embryo was successfully implanted in a female Southern white rhinoceros in 2023, but the surrogate mother died of unrelated causes before it could give birth. | |

=== Even-toed ungulates (order Artiodactyla) ===
==== Pigs (family Suidae) ====
| Common name | Scientific name | Range | Comments | Pictures |
|---|---|---|---|---|
| Cape warthog | Phacochoerus aethiopicus aethiopicus | Cape Province, South Africa | Last known individual killed in 1871. | |

==== Right and bowhead whales (family Balaenidae) ====
===== Locally extinct =====
| Common name | Scientific name | Range | Comments | Pictures |
|---|---|---|---|---|
| North Atlantic right whale | Eubalaena glacialis | North Atlantic and western Mediterranean Sea | Possibly calved in the Mediterranean in ancient times. Probable remains were found in Roman archaeological sites at Tetouan and Ceuta dated to 180-396 and 226-440 CE, respectively, and an individual was sighted off Algiers in 1888. A calving area existed in Western Sahara in recent times, but was declared extinct in 1998. The species is still present sporadically in Macaronesia, where it visits and possibly calves near the Açores and Canary Islands. | |

==== Gray whales (family Eschrichtiidae) ====
===== Locally extinct =====
| Common name | Scientific name | Range | Comments | Pictures |
|---|---|---|---|---|
| Gray whale | Eschrichtius robustus | North Atlantic, Mediterranean, and northern Pacific Ocean | Possibly calved in the Mediterranean in ancient times. Remains were found in Tetouan dating to 71–245 CE. A vagrant from the North Pacific population was seen off the coast of Namibia in May 2013. | |

==== True deer (family Cervidae) ====
| Scientific name | Range | Comments | Pictures |
|---|---|---|---|
| Megaceroides algericus | Northern Maghreb | Most recent remains dated to 4691-4059 BCE in Bizmoune, Morocco. | |

===== Locally extinct =====
| Common name | Scientific name | Range | Comments | Pictures |
|---|---|---|---|---|
| Persian fallow deer | Dama mesopotamica | Middle East | Deer, known as hnn in the Egyptian language, are depicted in art from the Predynastic to the Ptolemaic period, and remains of Persian fallow deer have been found in archaeological sites of the eastern Nile Delta dating mostly to the 14th-10th centuries BCE. However, the autochthonous nature of these animals is controversial, as is the presence of other deer species like red deer or chital in Ancient Egypt. | |

==== Cattle, goats, antelopes, and others (family Bovidae) ====
| Common name | Scientific name | Range | Comments | Pictures |
|---|---|---|---|---|
| Bubal hartebeest | Alcelaphus buselaphus buselaphus | North Africa and southern Levant | Present in Egypt along the Nile and in the oases of the western desert until the early Middle Ages. In Tunisia, the last individual was killed in 1902 near Tataouine; in Algeria, south of the Chott Ech Chergui in the 1920s; and in Morocco, in Missour, in 1925. | |
| Bond's springbok | Antidorcas bondi | Southern Africa | Most recent remains at Kruger Cave, South Africa dated to 5680-5560 BCE. | |
| North African aurochs | Bos primigenius mauritanicus | North Africa | Survived in Thebes, Egypt until 1175 BCE and the Nile Delta (Buto) until the Roman era. Hunting, habitat modification for agriculture, and competition with domestic cattle may have caused its decrease in numbers and ultimate disappearance. It was assumed from genetic and morphological evidence that the North African aurochs underwent indigenous domestication near the onset of the Holocene, but this has been rejected by other authors in favor of introduction of taurine cattle from the Ancient Near East, followed by indicine cattle at a later time. Nevertheless, there was extensive hybridization between domestic taurine cattle and African aurochs, and some African cattle breeds could descend from it to some extent, particularly in West Africa where the introgression of indicine cattle is low. | |
| | Caprinae indet. (Makapania?) | South Africa mountains | Most recent remains at Colwinton Shelter, South Africa dated to 4360-4280 BCE. The extinction coincided with changes in vegetation leading to the replacement of grazing ungulates for browsers. | Restoration of Makapania broomi |
| | Damaliscus hypsodon | Kenya and Tanzania | Most recent remains dated to after 8902-8638 BCE in Kisese II, Tanzania. | |
| Bluebuck | Hippotragus leucophaeus | Overberg, South Africa | Fossil evidence and rock art suggests that the species was more broadly spread around southern Africa in the Pleistocene and early Holocene, but its range contracted because of climate-driven vegetation change until it was reduced to just 4300 km^{2} east of Cape Town. It finally disappeared around 1800 CE as a result of hunting, competition with livestock, and habitat loss and fragmentation caused by agriculture. | |
| Roberts' lechwe | Kobus leche robertsi | Luongo and Kalungwishi drainage systems, Luapula, Zambia | Last seen between 1980 and 1985. | |
| Giant wildebeest | Megalotragus priscus | Southern and possibly eastern Africa | Most recent remains at Wonderwerk Cave, South Africa dated to 6442-6210 BCE. | |
| Kenya oribi | Ourebia ourebi kenyae | Lower slopes of Mount Kenya, Kenya | | |
| African giant buffalo | Syncerus antiquus | Africa and Arabia | Widespread through the continent in the Pleistocene, it became restricted to North Africa in the Holocene and survived until 3060-2470 BCE. Increased aridification and competition with domestic cattle have both been suggested as causes of its extinction. | |

===== Possibly extinct =====
| Common name | Scientific name | Range | Comments | Pictures |
|---|---|---|---|---|
| Tora hartebeest | Alcelaphus buselaphus tora | Southwestern Eritrea and the Ethiopian-Sudanese border | Last recorded in 1999. | |

===== Extinct in the wild =====
| Common name | Scientific name | Range | Comments | Pictures |
|---|---|---|---|---|
| Mohrr gazelle | Nanger dama mohrr | Northwestern Sahara | Disappeared from the wild in 1968, being last seen in Western Sahara. The first reintroduction program began in Senegal in 1984 and was followed by others in Morocco and Tunisia. The Tunisian project ended in failure with the death of the last animal in 2020. | |
| Scimitar oryx | Oryx dammah | North Africa and the Sahel | Disappeared from North Africa (Algeria) in the 1960s, apart from two possible vagrants observed in 1987, and was hunted to extinction in the Sahel in 1989. Captive populations were established in Tunisia 1985 and Senegal in 1998. It was reintroduced to the wild in the Ouadi-Rimé-Ouadi Achim Faunal Reserve in Chad in 2016. | |

===== Locally extinct =====
| Common name | Scientific name | Range | Comments | Pictures |
|---|---|---|---|---|
| Arabian oryx | Oryx leucoryx | Arabian Peninsula | Probably lived in the north of Egypt's eastern desert during historical times. | |

== Birds (class Aves) ==
=== Landfowl (order Galliformes) ===
==== Guineafowl (family Numididae) ====
===== Possibly extinct =====
| Common name | Scientific name | Range | Comments | Pictures |
|---|---|---|---|---|
| Moroccan guineafowl | Numida meleagris sabyi | Between the Oum er Rbia and Sebou rivers of Morocco | Last recorded with certainty in the wild in the 1950s. It succumbed to habitat destruction and over-hunting. Reports of a captive population in the 1980s are unsubstantiated. | |

=== Bustards (order Otidiformes) ===
==== Bustards (family Otididae) ====
===== Possibly extinct =====
| Common name | Scientific name | Range | Comments | Pictures |
|---|---|---|---|---|
| Moroccan bustard | Ardeotis arabs lynesi | Western Morocco | Last recorded at Lakes Merzouga and Tamezguidat between 1987 and 1993. All Arabian bustard subspecies declined due to hunting and habitat destruction. | |

=== Nightjars (order Caprimulgiformes) ===
==== Typical nightjars (family Caprimulgidae) ====
===== Possibly extinct =====
| Common name | Scientific name | Range | Comments |
|---|---|---|---|
| Itombwe nightjar | Caprimulgus primoginei | Itombwe Mountains, Democratic Republic of the Congo; possibly also northern Congo, Gabon, Cameroon, and Equatorial Guinea | Only known from a female collected at Melenge in the Itombwe in 1955. However, the call of an unknown nightjar species was recorded at Itombwe in 1996, and identical calls were recorded in Gabon in 1985, northern Congo in 1996, and Cameroon in 1997. |

=== Shorebirds (order Charadriiformes) ===
==== Oystercatchers (family Haematopodidae) ====
| Common name | Scientific name | Range | Comments | Pictures |
|---|---|---|---|---|
| Canary Islands oystercatcher | Haematopus meadewaldoi | Canary Islands to the coast of Senegal | Last recorded in Senegal between 1968 and 1981. Its decline was probably a result of overharvesting of intertidal invertebrates and disturbance by people, although predation by rats and cats has also been implicated. | |

==== Sandpipers (order Scolopacidae) ====
| Common name | Scientific name | Range | Comments | Pictures |
|---|---|---|---|---|
| Slender-billed curlew (Note: The species was declared extinct in late 2024, but the IUCN has not updated the status of the species.) | Numenius tenuirostris | North Africa and Western Eurasia | The species bred in Central Asia (the steppes of northern Kazakhstan and southern Siberia) and wintered in the Mediterranean area and south Arabia, but declined due to intense hunting in the wintering grounds and habitat destruction in the breeding grounds. Slender-billed curlews were regular visitors to Merja Zerga, Morocco until 1995. | |

==== Auks (family Alcidae) ====
| Common name | Scientific name | Range | Comments | Pictures |
|---|---|---|---|---|
| Great auk | Pinguinus impennis | Northern Atlantic and western Mediterranean | A bone found in El Harhoura 2, Morocco was dated to 5050-3850 BCE. This is the second southernmost record of this species in the eastern Atlantic, after another bone from Madeira. The species became extinct globally in 1852. | |

=== Hawks and relatives (order Accipitriformes) ===
==== Hawks, eagles, kites, harriers and Old World vultures (family Accipitridae) ====
===== Locally extinct =====
| Common name | Scientific name | Range | Comments | Pictures |
|---|---|---|---|---|
| Spanish imperial eagle | Aquila adalberti | Southwestern Iberia and northwestern Morocco | Could have disappeared as a breeder from Morocco before 1950, though two adult pairs were seen in Tassaoti, Oued Laou and the mouth of the Moulouya river in 1977. Vagrant juveniles still visit the northern part of the country from the Guadalquivir marshes and are sometimes killed in unprotected power lines. | |
| Red kite | Milvus milvus | Europe and the Mediterranean region | Last bred in Morocco in 2004, although small numbers can be seen in the winter. Its presence in other African countries is at best uncertain. | |

=== Perching birds (order Passeriformes) ===
==== Cisticolas and allies (family Cisticolidae) ====
===== Possibly extinct =====
| Common name | Scientific name | Range | Comments |
|---|---|---|---|
| Northern white-winged apalis | Apalis chariessa chariessa | Lower Tana River, Kenya | Last recorded in 1961, when the forests of Mitole were cleared. |
| Western Turner's eremomela | Eremomela turneri kalindei | Southeast Democratic Republic of the Congo and southwest Uganda | Last recorded in the 1970s. |

==== Crombecs (family Macrosphenidae) ====
===== Possibly extinct =====
| Common name | Scientific name | Range | Comments |
|---|---|---|---|
| Chapin's crombec | Sylvietta leucophrys chapini | Lendu Plateau, Democratic Republic of Congo | Possibly a separate species, found in gallery forests. Last recorded in 1942. The location is now completely deforested. |

== Reptiles (class Reptilia) ==
=== Squamates (order Squamata) ===
==== Plated lizards (family Gerrhosauridae) ====
| Common name | Scientific name | Range | Comments |
|---|---|---|---|
| Eastwood's long-tailed seps | Tetradactylus eastwoodae | Limpopo, South Africa | Last seen in 1928. Its natural habitat was destroyed by afforestation. |

== Amphibians (class Amphibia) ==
=== Toads and frogs (order Anura) ===
==== True toads (family Bufonidae) ====
===== Possibly extinct =====
| Common name | Scientific name | Range | Comments |
|---|---|---|---|
| Osgood's Ethiopian toad | Altiphrynoides osgoodi | Mountains of south-central Ethiopia | Last recorded in 2003. |

===== Extinct in the wild =====
| Common name | Scientific name | Range | Comments | Pictures |
|---|---|---|---|---|
| Kihansi spray toad | Nectophrynoides asperginis | Kihansi Falls, Udzungwa Mountains, Tanzania | Last recorded in the wild in 2004, with an unconfirmed report in 2005. The species declined due to drought, chytridiomycosis, pesticide use in maize agriculture, and possibly other causes. Nevertheless, thousands exist in captivity and a reintroduction program began with large numbers in 2012. | |

==== African torrent frogs (family Petropedetidae) ====
===== Possibly extinct =====
| Common name | Scientific name | Range | Comments | Pictures |
|---|---|---|---|---|
| Du Toit's torrent frog | Arthroleptides dutoiti | Kenya-Uganda border | Last recorded in 1962. It might have disappeared due to chytridiomycosis. | |

==== African puddle frogs (family Phrynobatrachidae) ====
===== Possibly extinct =====
| Common name | Scientific name | Range | Comments |
|---|---|---|---|
| Lake Oku puddle frog | Phrynobatrachus njiomok | Kilum-Ijim forest, Mount Oku, Cameroon | Last recorded in 2010. Though the causes are unknown, the pattern of decline is consistent with chytridiomycosis. |

== Ray-finned fish (class Actinopterygii) ==
=== Carps, barbs, minnows, and allies (order Cypriniformes) ===
==== Carps, barbs, and barbels (family Cyprinidae) ====
| Common name | Scientific name | Range | Comments | Pictures |
|---|---|---|---|---|
| | Labeobarbus microbarbis | Lake Luhondo, Rwanda | Known from a single individual collected c. 1937, it is presumed to have become extinct in the 1950s after the introduction of Tilapia and Haplochromis to the lake. However the validity of the species is doubtful and could be a hybrid of Barbus and Varicorhinus instead. | |
| Giant Atlas barbel | Labeobarbus reinii | Northwestern Morocco | Last recorded in 2001. The rivers it inhabited have been affected by pollution and damming, but the precise causes of extinction are poorly understood. | |
| Tunisian barb | Luciobarbus antinorii | Chott el Djerid, Tunisia | Last collected in 1989. It could have disappeared due to excessive water substraction. | |
| | Luciobarbus nasus | Ksob river drainage, Morocco | Last recorded in 1874. The river has been affected by pollution and damming, but the precise causes of extinction are poorly understood. | |

=== Salmon, trout and relatives (order Salmoniformes) ===
==== Salmon, trout and relatives (family Salmonidae) ====
| Common name | Scientific name | Range | Comments |
|---|---|---|---|
| Lake Sidi Ali trout | Salmo pallaryi | Lake Aguelmame Sidi Ali, Morocco | Disappeared in 1934 after the introduction of the Eurasian carp. |

=== Toothcarps (order Cyprinodontiformes) ===
==== African lampeyes (family Procatopodidae) ====
| Scientific name | Range | Comments |
|---|---|---|
| Aplocheilichthys sp. nov. 'Naivasha' | Lake Naivasha, Kenya | Disappeared in the 1970s or 1980s due to competition with, and predation by introduced fishes. |

== Insects (class Insecta) ==
=== Butterflies and moths (order Lepidoptera) ===
==== Gossamer-winged butterflies (family Lycaenidae) ====
| Common name | Scientific name | Range | Comments | Pictures |
|---|---|---|---|---|
| Mbashe River buff | Deloneura immaculata | Mbhashe River, Eastern Cape, South Africa | Only known from three individuals collected "at the end of December 1863". | |
| Morant's blue | Lepidochrysops hypopolia | Eastern South Africa | Only recorded in the 1870s. | |

=== Bark lice, book lice, and parasitic lice (order Psocodea) ===
==== Family Linognathidae ====
===== Possibly extinct =====
| Scientific name | Range | Comments |
|---|---|---|
| Linognathus petasmatus | North Africa | Parasite of the scimitar oryx and possibly also the addax. Could have been lost while trying to breed its host in captivity. |

== Ostracods (class Ostracoda) ==
=== Order Podocopida ===
==== Family Candonidae ====
| Scientific name | Range | Comments | Pictures |
|---|---|---|---|
| Namibcypris costata | Southern Kaokoveld, Namibia | Last recorded in 1987. | |

== Plants (kingdom Plantae) ==
=== Ferns (class Polypodiopsida) ===
==== Ladyferns and allies (family Athyriaceae) ====
===== Possibly extinct =====
| Scientific name | Range | Comments |
|---|---|---|
| Diplazium ulugurense | Bondwa, Uluguru Mountains, Tanzania | Only known from the holotype collected in 1970. The area has been completely deforested for agriculture since then. |

==== Bracken ferns (family Dennstaedtiaceae) ====
===== Possibly extinct =====
| Scientific name | Range | Comments | Pictures |
|---|---|---|---|
| Blotiella coriacea | South Uluguru Mountains, Tanzania | Only known from the holotype collected in 1971. The area was later deforested completely for agriculture. | |

=== Gymnosperms (clade Gymnospermae) ===
==== Sago-palms (family Zamiaceae) ====
===== Extinct in the wild =====
| Common name | Scientific name | Range | Comments | Pictures |
|---|---|---|---|---|
| Escarpment cycad | Encephalartos brevifoliolatus | Blyderivierspoort Nature Reserve, Limpopo, South Africa | All surviving plants were moved to ex-situ captivity in 2004, after the only known population was threatened by private collectors. | |
| Blue cycad | Encephalartos nubimontanus | Drakensberg, Limpopo, South Africa | Last recorded in the wild in 2001. Extirpated by private collectors. | |
| Parlota cycad | Encephalartos relictus | Lebombo Mountains, Eswatini | Last recorded in the wild in 1971. Extirpated by private collectors. | |
| Wood's cycad | Encephalartos woodii | Ngoye Forest, northern KwaZulu-Natal, South Africa | The only known individual, a male, was transplanted into captivity in 1916. | |

===== Possibly extinct in the wild =====
| Common name | Scientific name | Range | Comments | Pictures |
|---|---|---|---|---|
| Waxen cycad | Encephalartos cerinus | Buffelsrivier Valley, central KwaZulu-Natal, South Africa | Last recorded in the wild before 2000. Declined due to over-collection for ornamental purposes. | |
| Venda cycad | Encephalartos hirsutus | Soutpansberg, Limpopo, South Africa | Last recorded in the wild in 2004. Declined due to over-collection for ornamental purposes. | |
| Lydenburg cycad | Encephalartos inopinus | Steelpoort and Olifant Rivers, Mpumalanga, South Africa | Last recorded in the wild in 2004. Declined due to over-collection for ornamental purposes. | |

=== Flowering plants (clade Angiospermae) ===
==== Custard apples (family Annonaceae) ====
===== Possibly extinct =====
| Scientific name | Range | Comments |
|---|---|---|
| Uvaria decidua | Mlinguru, south of Lindi, Tanzania | Only known from the holotype collected in 1935. |

==== Celeries, carrots, and parsleys (family Apiaceae) ====
| Common name | Scientific name | Range | Comments | Pictures |
|---|---|---|---|---|
| Silphium | Ferula or Thapsia sp. | Cyrenaica coast, Libya | Reputed to be the first extinction of a species documented in history, as it was said by Pliny the Elder to have disappeared through overgrazing and overharvesting until the last living plant was collected and given as a curiosity to Emperor Nero (r. 54-68 AD) in Rome . Some modern researchers suggest that desertification was the actual primary driver of silphium's extinction, though others defend that silphium did not actually go extinct but survived in other part of the Mediterranean Region under a different name. | |

==== Dogbanes (family Apocynaceae) ====
===== Possibly extinct =====
| Scientific name | Range | Comments |
|---|---|---|
| Hunteria hexaloba | Libreville, Gabon | Last recorded in 1902. Found in estuarine coastal forests that were largely destroyed for urban expansion, sand extraction, firewood collection and plantation agriculture. |

==== Sunflowers (family Asteraceae) ====
===== Possibly extinct =====
| Scientific name | Range | Comments |
|---|---|---|
| Anisopappus burundiensis | Central Burundi | Only known from the holotype collected in 1967. The grassland it occurred in has since been converted for agriculture. |
| Cotula myriophylloides | Cape Peninsula, South Africa | Last recorded in 1971. It was found in wetlands that were largely drained for urban development or invaded by exotic plants. |
| Macledium pretoriense | Pretoria, South Africa | Only known from the holotype collected in 1925. |
| Senecio navugabensis | Lake Navugabo, southwestern Uganda | Only known from the holotype collected in 1935. |

==== Begonias (family Bignoniaceae) ====
===== Possibly extinct =====
| Scientific name | Range | Comments |
|---|---|---|
| Stereospermum zenkeri | Yaounde, Cameroon | Last recorded in 1950. Its known range was destroyed by urban expansion. |

==== Sedges (family Cyperaceae) ====
| Scientific name | Range | Comments |
|---|---|---|
| Scleria chevalieri | Western Senegal | Last collected in 1929. |

===== Possibly extinct =====
| Scientific name | Range | Comments |
|---|---|---|
| Cyperus chionocephalus | Ethiopia | Last collected in 1939. Possibly extinct due to habitat degradation caused by livestockgrazing, firewood collection, and agriculture. |

==== Ebony trees and persimmons (family Ebenaceae) ====
===== Possibly extinct =====
| Scientific name | Range | Comments |
|---|---|---|
| Diospyros katendei | Kasyoha-Kitomi Central Forest Reserve, Uganda | Only known from the holotype. |

==== Pipeworts (family Eriocaulaceae) ====
| Scientific name | Range | Comments |
|---|---|---|
| Eriocaulon inundatum | Senegalese coast | Last recorded in 1943. The area near the original locality has since been destroyed by salt mining. |
| Eriocaulon jordanii | Sierra Leonean coast | Last recorded in the early 1950s. |

==== Euphorbias (family Euphorbiaceae) ====
| Scientific name | Range | Comments |
|---|---|---|
| Acalypha dikuluwensis | Katangan Copperbelt, Democratic Republic of the Congo | Last recorded in 1959. Extinct due to habitat destruction caused by surface mining. |

===== Possibly extinct =====
| Scientific name | Range | Comments |
|---|---|---|
| Euphorbia neospinescens | Chunya District, Tanzania | Last collected in 1965. Possibly declined due to agriculture expansion and charcoal burning. |

==== Legumes (family Fabaceae) ====
===== Possibly extinct =====
| Scientific name | Range | Comments |
|---|---|---|
| Aeschynomene ruspoliana | Southern Ethiopia | Only known from the holotype collected in 1893. |
| Rhynchosia ledermannii | Bamenda Highlands, Babju, Cameroon | Only known from the holotype collected in 1908, which is now lost. The area has since been largely deforested for agriculture use and firewood collection. |

==== Mints (family Lamiaceae) ====
===== Possibly extinct =====
| Scientific name | Range | Comments |
|---|---|---|
| Plectranthus scopulicola | West Usambara, Tanzania | Last collected in 1953. Possibly extinct due to habitat loss to agriculture. |

==== Showy mistletoes (family Loranthaceae) ====
===== Possibly extinct =====
| Scientific name | Range | Comments |
|---|---|---|
| Agelanthus rondensis | Eastern Rondo Plateau, Tanzania | Known only from the holotype collected in 1903. |

==== Nances (family Malpighiaceae) ====
===== Possibly extinct =====
| Scientific name | Range | Comments |
|---|---|---|
| Triaspis schliebeni | Lake Lutamba, Lindi District, Tanzania | Last recorded in 1935. Possibly extinct due to habitat loss caused by agriculture. |

==== Mallows (family Malvaceae) ====
| Scientific name | Range | Comments |
|---|---|---|
| Byttneria ivorensis | Côte d'Ivoire | Only known from the holotype collected in 1896. |

==== Melastomes (family Melastomataceae) ====
===== Possibly extinct =====
| Scientific name | Range | Comments |
|---|---|---|
| Lijndenia brenanii | Usambara Mountains, Tanzania | Last recorded in 1961. The known range was degraded due to overcollection, logging, gold mining, and introduced Maesopsis. |

==== Mulberries and fig trees (family Moraceae) ====
===== Possibly extinct =====
| Scientific name | Range | Comments |
|---|---|---|
| Dorstenia bicaudata | East Usambara and Uluguru Mountains, Tanzania | Last collected in 1950. |

==== Myrtles (family Myrtaceae) ====
===== Possibly extinct =====
| Scientific name | Range | Comments |
|---|---|---|
| Eugenia scheffleri | Usambara Mountains, Tanzania | Last collected in 1900. Possibly extinct due to the clearing of forest for agriculture. |

==== Orchids (family Orchidaceae) ====
===== Possibly extinct =====
| Scientific name | Range | Comments |
|---|---|---|
| Cynorkis usambarae | East Usambara Mountains, Tanzania | Known only from the holotype collected in 1893. |
| Disperis egregia | East Usambara Mountains, Tanzania | Last collected in 1944. Possibly extinct due to habitat degradation caused by logging and the invasive umbrella tree Maesopsis eminii. |
| Rhipidoglossum orientalis | Nguru Mountains, Tanzania | Only known from the holotype collected in 1933. |
| Polystachya acuminata | Usambara Mountains, Tanzania | Last collected in 1943. Possibly extinct due to deforestation for logging and agriculture. |
| Polystachya canaliculata | Nguru Mountains, Tanzania | Last collected between 1943 and 1962. The original range is now completely deforested. |
| Polystachya porphyrochila | Uluguru Mountains, Tanzania | Last collected between 1970 and 1982. The original range is now almost completely deforested for agricultural use. |
| Polystachya rugosilabia | Nguru Mountains, Tanzania | Last collected in 1942. The original range is now largely used for cardamom cultivation. |
| Tridactyle sarcodantha | Uluguru Mountains, Tanzania | Last collected in 1933. The original range is largely deforested for agricultural use. |

==== True grasses (family Poaceae) ====
===== Possibly extinct =====
| Scientific name | Range | Comments |
|---|---|---|
| Eleocharis lepta | Cape Peninsula, South Africa | Only recorded once in 1897, when it was noted as rare. |
| Panicum pearsonii | Great Karasberg, Namibia | Only known from the holotype collected in 1913. |

==== Proteas (family Proteaceae) ====
| Common name | Scientific name | Range | Comments |
|---|---|---|---|
| Wynberg conebush | Leucadendron grandiflorum | Cape Peninsula, South Africa | Last recorded in 1806. Likely extinct due to habitat destruction caused by vineyard farming. |
| Wolseley conebush | Leucadendron spirale | Lower Breede River Valley, South Africa | Last recorded in 1933. Possibly extinct due to habitat destruction caused by timber plantations and agriculture, and competition with invasive plants. |

==== Coffee and relatives (family Rubiaceae) ====
| Scientific name | Range | Comments |
|---|---|---|
| Argocoffeopsis lemblinii | Valley of Agnieby, Côte d'Ivoire | Only known from the holotype collected in 1907. |
| Corynanthe brachythyrsus | Bipinde, western Cameroon | Only known from the holotype collected in 1746. |

==== Passion flowers (family Passifloraceae) ====
| Scientific name | Range | Comments |
|---|---|---|
| Basananthe cupricola | Mine de l’Etoile, Katangan Copperbelt, Democratic Republic of the Congo | Last recorded in 1980. Extinct due to habitat destruction caused by surface mining. |

== See also ==
- List of Madagascar and Indian Ocean Island animals extinct in the Holocene
- List of Macaronesian animals extinct in the Holocene
- List of Saint Helena, Ascension and Tristan da Cunha animals extinct in the Holocene
- Lists of extinct species
- List of extinct bird species since 1500
- Extinct in the wild
- Lazarus taxon
