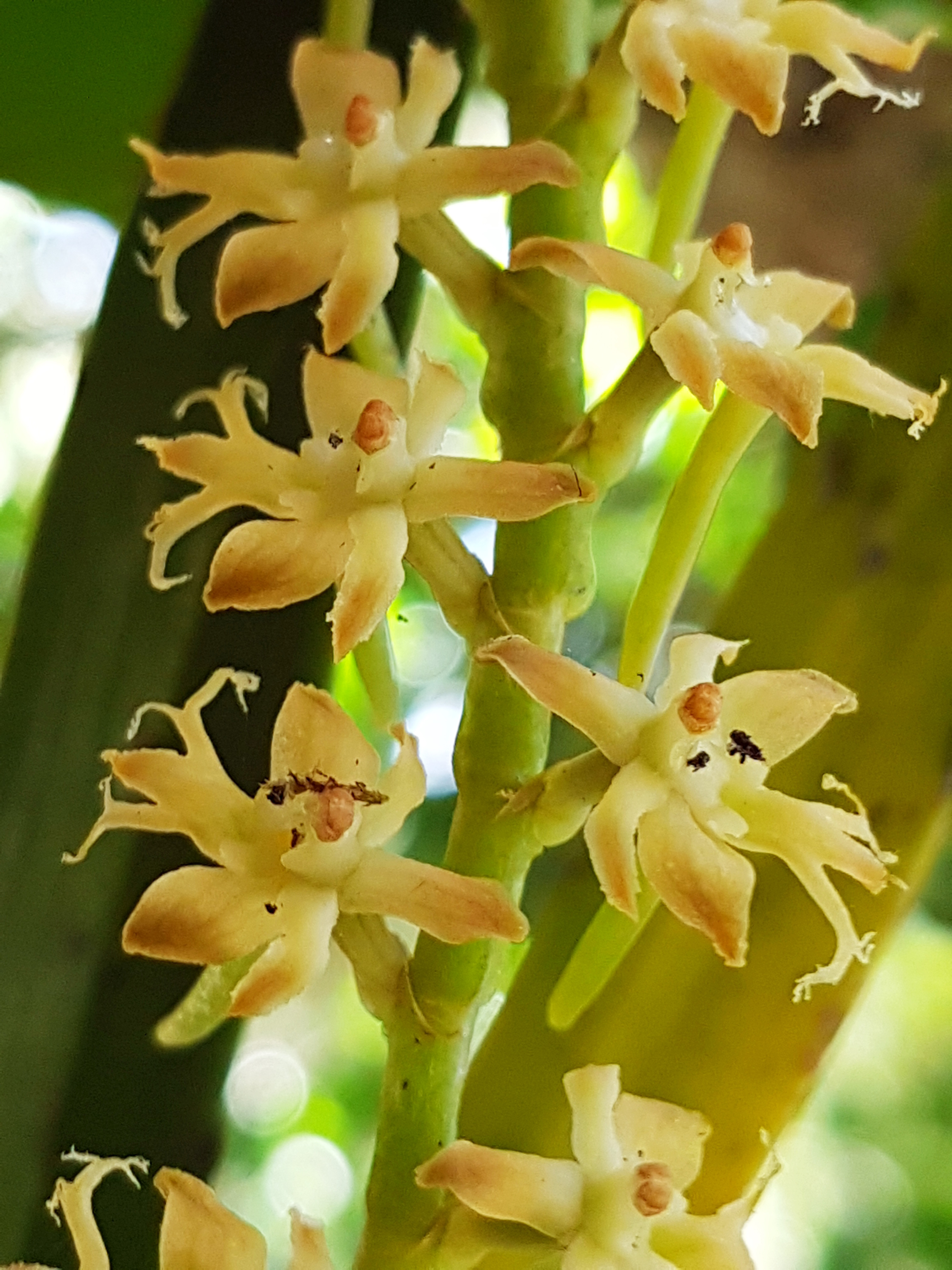

Scientific classification
- Kingdom: Plantae
- Clade: Tracheophytes
- Clade: Angiosperms
- Clade: Monocots
- Order: Asparagales
- Family: Orchidaceae
- Subfamily: Epidendroideae
- Genus: Tridactyle
- Species: T. bicaudata

Binomial name
- Tridactyle bicaudata (Lindl.) Schltr.

= Tridactyle bicaudata =

Species of orchid

Tridactyle bicaudata is a species of flowering plant in the family Orchidaceae. This species can be found throughout most of Africa, from the Cape Province to Kenya and Ghana. It also can be found in a wide variety of different habitats, which makes it very amenable to cultivation. It has a monopodial growth habit, and can typically be found growing in clumps on rocks or on low lying tree branches. The flowers are canary yellow, 2 cm wide, and have a lip lobed into three sections. Two of the outlying lobes are fimbriated. Usually, 8-16 flowers are born on an inflorescence, with multiple racemes possible resulting in a flower count in the thousands. The flowers form two rows on the single inflorescence. The species contains one subspecies, namely Tridactyle bicaudata subsp. rupestris.
