= Rhipidoglossum pareense =

Scientific classification
- Kingdom: Plantae
- Clade: Tracheophytes
- Clade: Angiosperms
- Clade: Monocots
- Order: Asparagales
- Family: Orchidaceae
- Subfamily: Epidendroideae
- Genus: Rhipidoglossum
- Species: R. pareense

Binomial name
- Rhipidoglossum pareense P.J.Cribb & Hemp, 2022

Species of plant

Rhipidoglossum pareense is a species of orchid in the genus Rhipidoglossum that can be found in the South Pare Mountains and west Usambara Mountains of north-eastern Tanzania up to 1,500 meters in altitude. It can reach these altitudes due to the humid and foggy climate of the mountains it lives in. R. pareense is just a few centimeters tall and has small white flowers that grow from the plant. It was named after the Pare Mountains, where it was discovered.

The species belonged to a group of species thought to be part of the orchid genus Margelliantha and was noted by its dwarf habit, short stem, and inflorescence of few campanulate flowers.
