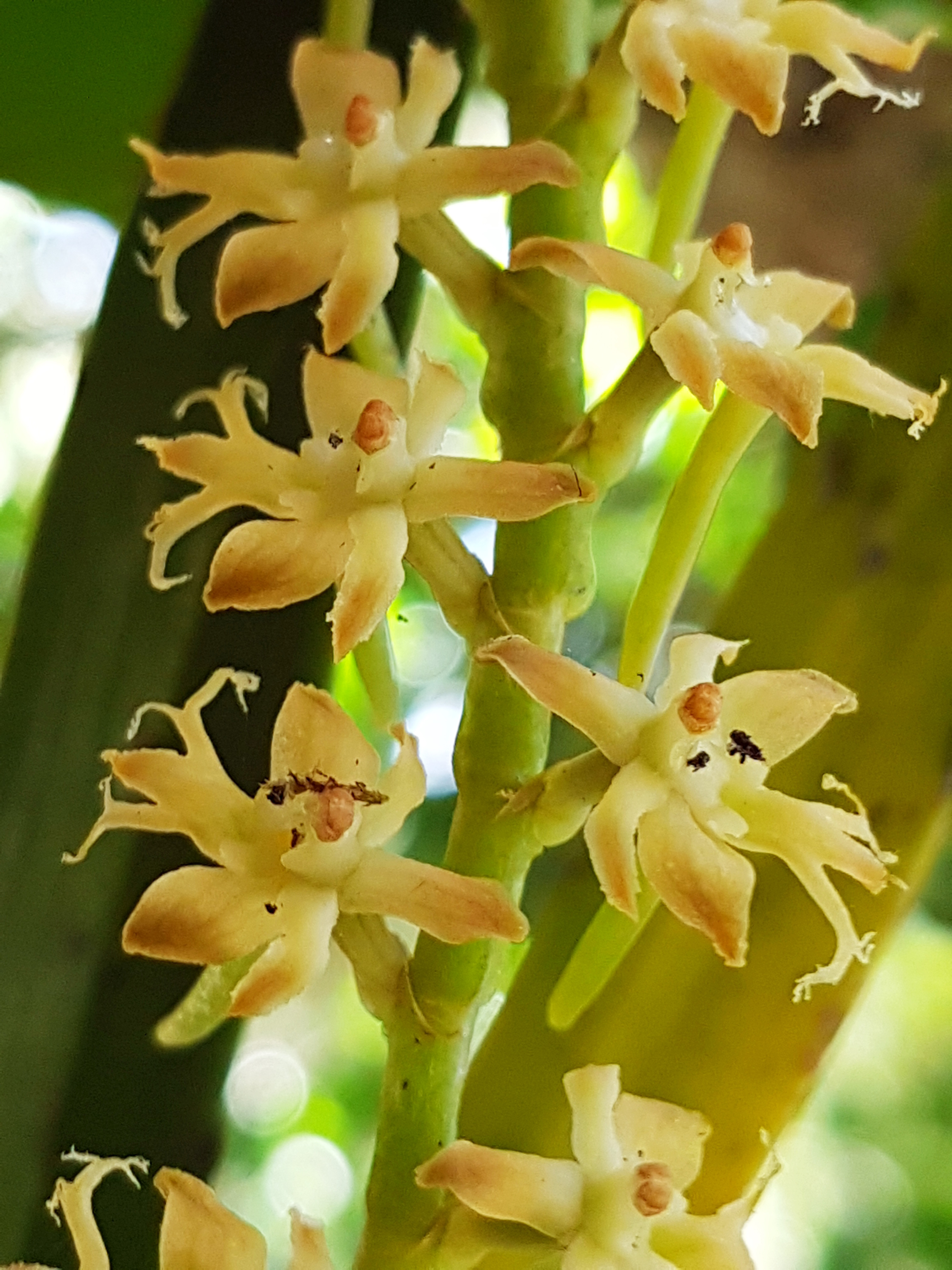
- Tridactyle bicaudata in South Africa

Scientific classification
- Kingdom: Plantae
- Clade: Tracheophytes
- Clade: Angiosperms
- Clade: Monocots
- Order: Asparagales
- Family: Orchidaceae
- Subfamily: Epidendroideae
- Tribe: Vandeae
- Subtribe: Angraecinae
- Genus: Tridactyle; Schltr.

Species
- See text

= Tridactyle =

Genus of orchids

Tridactyle is a genus of flowering plants from the orchid family, Orchidaceae. It has about 60-70 known species, all native to sub-Saharan Africa.

== Species ==
Tridactyle species accepted by the Plants of the World Online as of February 2021:

- Tridactyle anthomaniaca (Rchb.f.) Summerh.
- Tridactyle armeniaca (Lindl.) Schltr.
- Tridactyle aurantiopunctata P.J.Cribb & Stévart
- Tridactyle bicaudata (Lindl.) Schltr.
- Tridactyle brevicalcarata Summerh.
- Tridactyle brevifolia Mansf.
- Tridactyle crassifolia Summerh.
- Tridactyle cruciformis Summerh.
- Tridactyle eggelingii Summerh.
- Tridactyle exellii P.J.Cribb & Stévart
- Tridactyle filifolia (Schltr.) Schltr.
- Tridactyle fimbriatipetala (De Wild.) Schltr.
- Tridactyle flabellata P.J.Cribb
- Tridactyle fusifera Mansf.
- Tridactyle gentilii (De Wild.) Schltr.
- Tridactyle hurungweensis Fibeck
- Tridactyle inaequilonga (De Wild.) Schltr.
- Tridactyle inflata Summerh.
- Tridactyle lagosensis (Rolfe) Schltr.
- Tridactyle latifolia Summerh.
- Tridactyle laurentii (De Wild.) Schltr.
- Tridactyle lisowskii (Szlach.) Szlach. & Olszewski
- Tridactyle minuta P.J.Cribb
- Tridactyle minutifolia Stévart & D'haijère
- Tridactyle muriculata (Rendle) Schltr.
- Tridactyle nalaensis (De Wild.) Schltr.
- Tridactyle nanne-ritzkae Eb.Fisch., Killmann, J.-P.Lebel & Delep.
- Tridactyle nigrescens Summerh.
- Tridactyle oblongifolia Summerh.
- Tridactyle pentalobata P.J.Cribb & Stévart
- Tridactyle phaeocephala Summerh.
- Tridactyle scottellii (Rendle) Schltr.
- Tridactyle stevartiana Geerinck
- Tridactyle stipulata (De Wild.) Schltr.
- Tridactyle thomensis P.J.Cribb & Stévart
- Tridactyle translucens Summerh.
- Tridactyle tridactylites (Rolfe) Schltr.
- Tridactyle tridentata (Harv.) Schltr.
- Tridactyle trimikeorum Dare
- Tridactyle truncatiloba Summerh.
- Tridactyle unguiculata Mansf.
- Tridactyle vanderlaaniana Geerinck
- Tridactyle verrucosa P.J.Cribb
- Tridactyle virginea P.J.Cribb & la Croix
- Tridactyle virgula (Kraenzl.) Schltr.

== See also ==
- List of Orchidaceae genera
