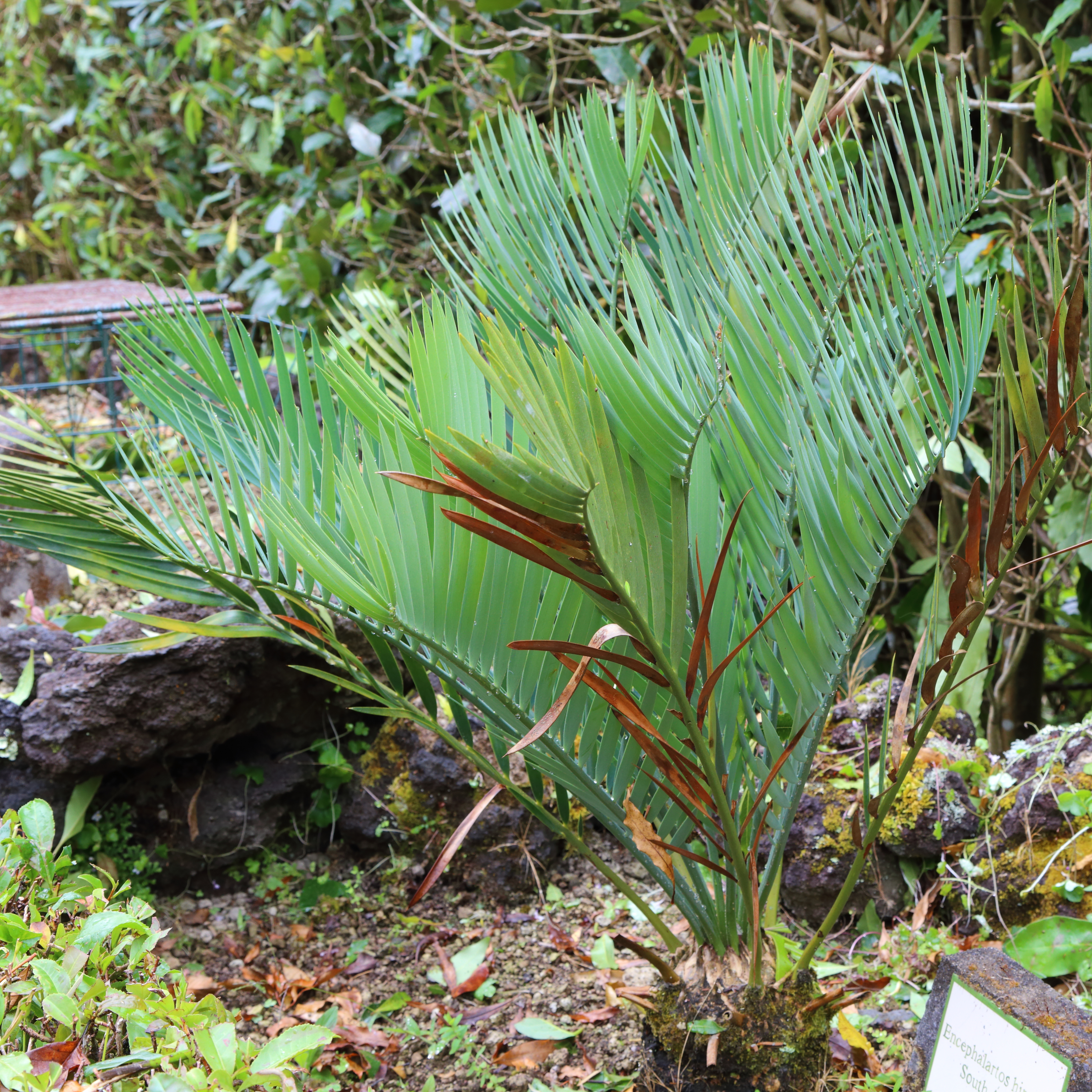

Conservation status
- Critically endangered, possibly extinct in the wild (IUCN 3.1)
- CITES Appendix I (CITES)

Scientific classification
- Kingdom: Plantae
- Clade: Tracheophytes
- Clade: Gymnospermae
- Division: Cycadophyta
- Class: Cycadopsida
- Order: Cycadales
- Family: Zamiaceae
- Genus: Encephalartos
- Species: E. hirsutus

Binomial name
- Encephalartos hirsutus P.J.H. Hurter 1996

= Encephalartos hirsutus =

Species of cycad

Encephalartos hirsutus is a species of cycad that is native to Limpopo Province of South Africa. It was recorded from three separate localities on south-east-facing quartzite cliffs in the Makuya Nature Reserve bordering the Kruger National Park at elevations ranging from 800–1,000 meters (2,600–3,300 ft) above sea level.

As of 2020, it is assumed there are up to 10 individuals in the wild.

== Description ==
It is an arborescent cycad, with an erect stem, which becomes decumbent in older specimens, up to 4 m (13 ft) high and with a diameter of 35–40 cm (14–16 in). The leaves, pinnate, arranged in a crown at the apex of the stem, are 1.1–1.4 m (3 ft 7 in – 4 ft 7 in) long, supported by a petiole about 13 cm (5.1 in) long, and composed of numerous pairs of elliptic leaflets and coriaceous, long 13–17 cm (5.1–6.7 in), with entire margin and thorny apex, fixed on the rachis with an angle of about 40°, reduced to thorns towards the base of the petiole. It is a dioecious species, with male specimens that have from 2 to 5 cylindrical-ovoid cones, erect, about 50 cm (20 in) long and 9 cm (3.5 in) broad, and female specimens with 1–3 ovoid cones, about 40 cm (16 in) long and 35 cm (14 in) broad, of glaucous green color, glabrous. The seeds are coarsely ovoid, 3–3.5 cm (1.2–1.4 in) long, covered with an orange-red sarcotesta.

== Threats ==
This species has effectively been extirpated in the wild due to over-collecting for ornamental purposes.

== Gallery ==
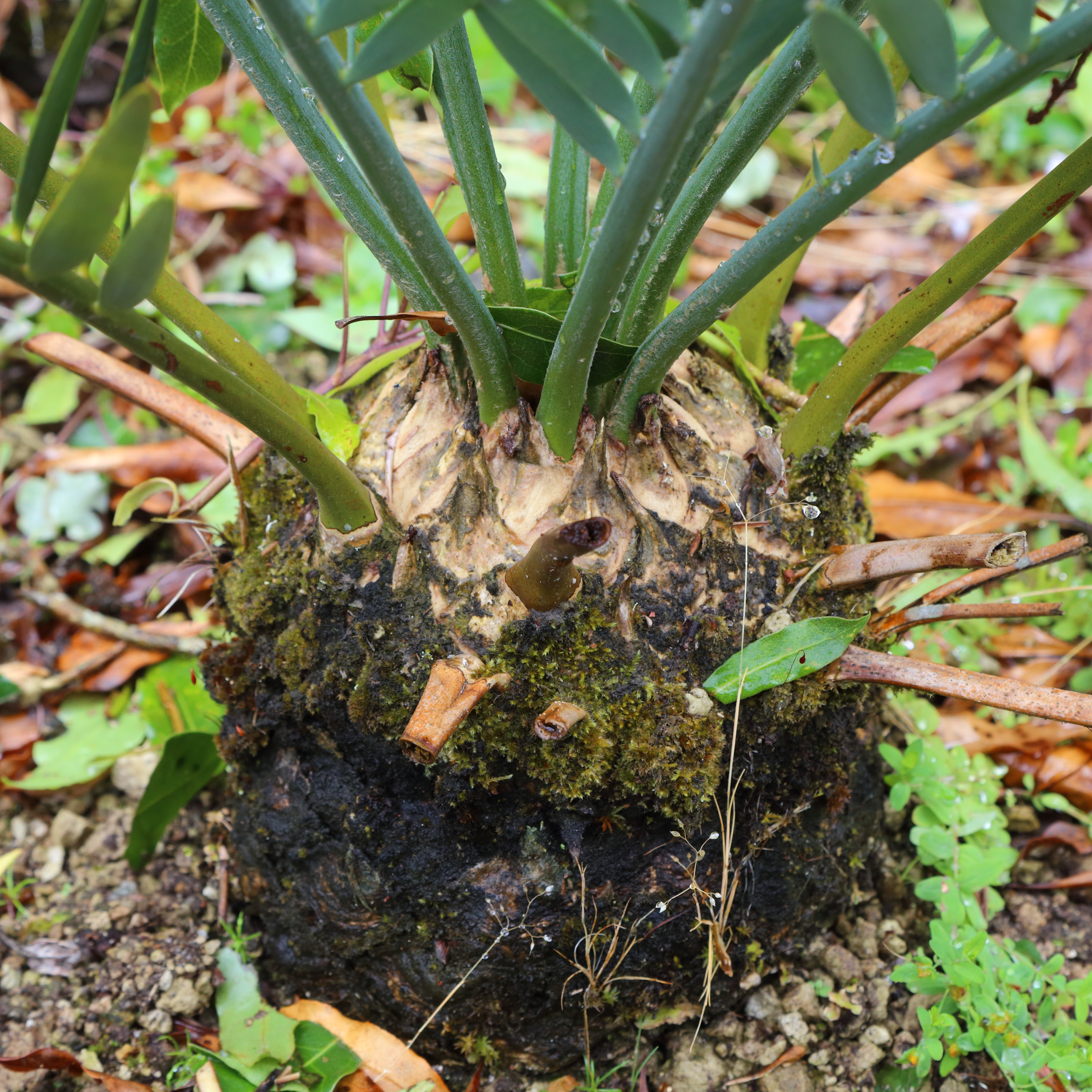
Trunk

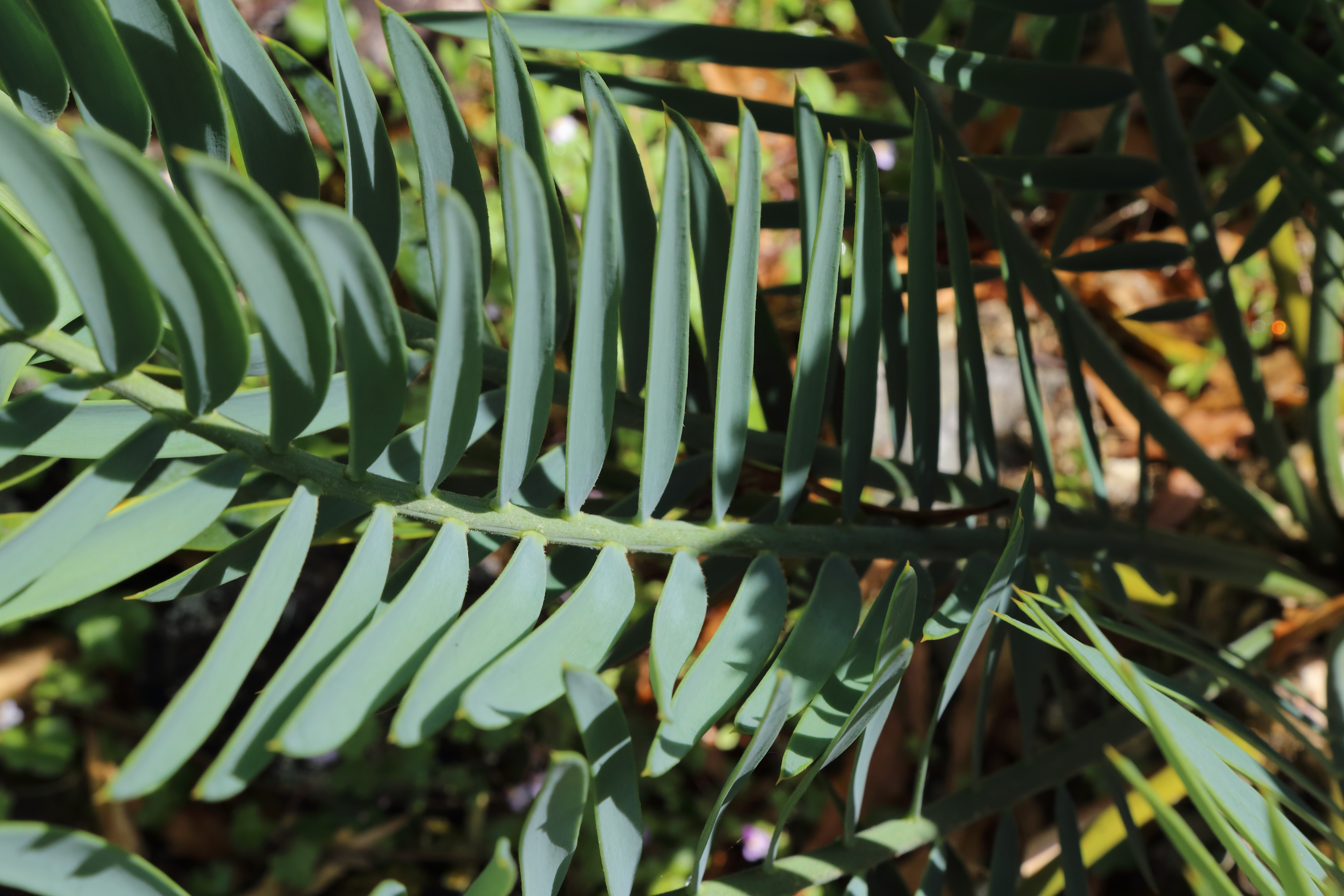
Leaves
