= Cyperus chionocephalus =

Conservation status
- Critically endangered, possibly extinct (IUCN 3.1)

Scientific classification
- Kingdom: Plantae
- Clade: Tracheophytes
- Clade: Angiosperms
- Clade: Monocots
- Clade: Commelinids
- Order: Poales
- Family: Cyperaceae
- Genus: Cyperus
- Species: C. chionocephalus

Binomial name
- Cyperus chionocephalus (Chiov.) Chiov. ex Chiarugi

Species of sedge

Cyperus chionocephalus is a species of sedge that is native to Ethiopia.

== See also ==
- List of Cyperus species
