= Leucadendron spirale =

Conservation status
- Extinct (IUCN 3.1)

Scientific classification
- Kingdom: Plantae
- Clade: Tracheophytes
- Clade: Angiosperms
- Clade: Eudicots
- Order: Proteales
- Family: Proteaceae
- Genus: Leucadendron
- Species: †L. spirale

Binomial name
- †Leucadendron spirale (Salisb. ex Knight) I.Williams

Extinct species of flowering plant

Leucadendron spirale, the Wolseley conebush, was a flower-bearing shrub belonging to the genus Leucadendron and formed part of the fynbos. The plant was native to the Western Cape where it was found in the Breede River Valley between Wolseley and Botha, before becoming extinct. The plant was observed only four times, in 1801, 1819, 1820s and 1933.

In Afrikaans it is known as Wolseley-tolbos.
