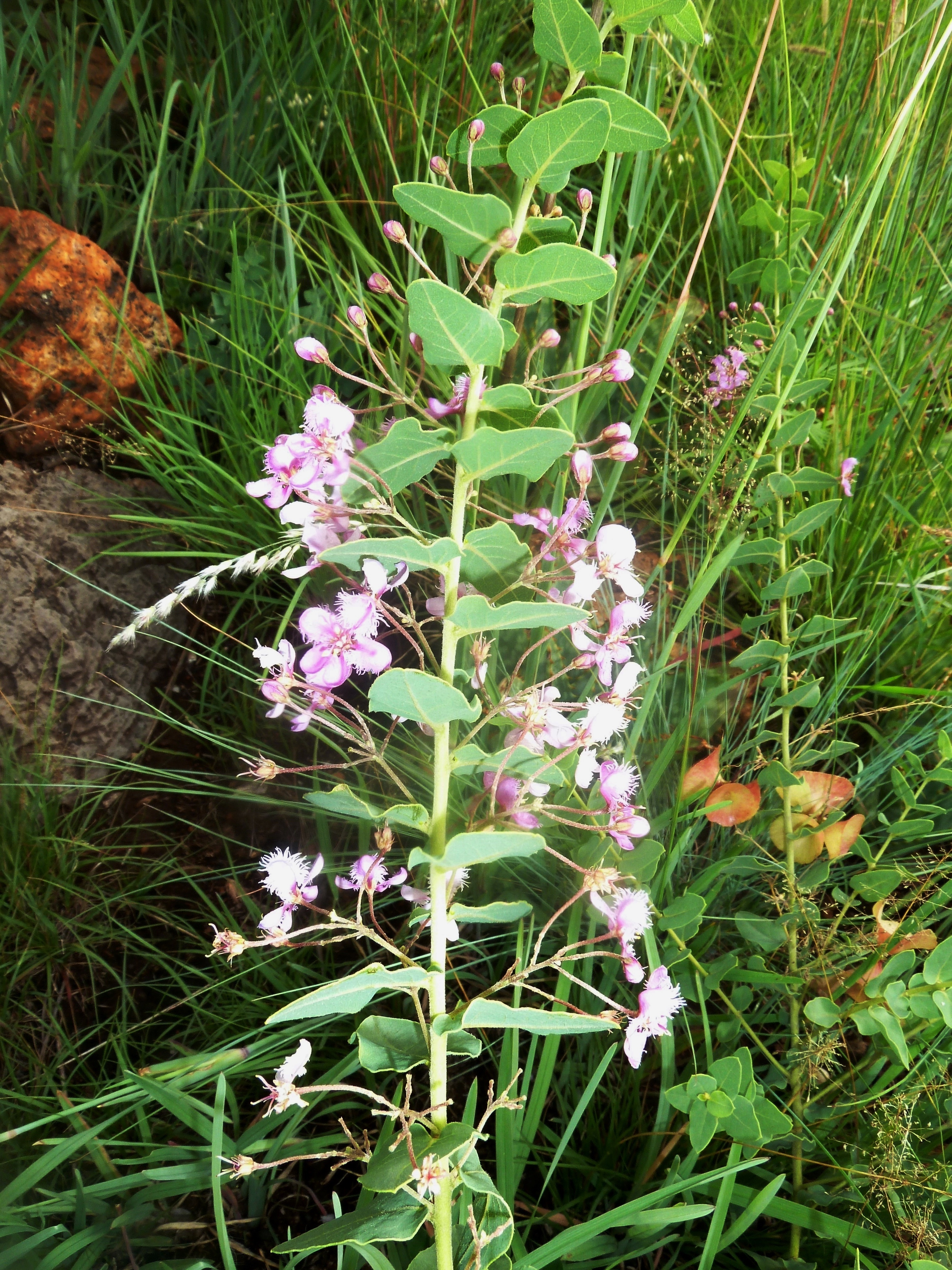
- Triaspis hypericoides in South Africa

Scientific classification
- Kingdom: Plantae
- Clade: Tracheophytes
- Clade: Angiosperms
- Clade: Eudicots
- Clade: Rosids
- Order: Malpighiales
- Family: Malpighiaceae
- Genus: Triaspis; Burch.

Species
- ca. 15 species

= Triaspis (plant) =

Genus of plants

Triaspis is a genus in the Malpighiaceae, a family of about 75 genera of flowering plants in the order Malpighiales. Triaspis comprises ca. 15 species of vines and shrubs native to sub-Saharan Africa.

== Species ==
- Triaspis dumeticola Launert
- Triaspis emarginata De Wild.
- Triaspis erlangeri Engl.
- Triaspis glaucophylla Engl.
- Triaspis hypericoides (DC.) Burch.
- Triaspis lateriflora Oliv.
- Triaspis letestuana Launert
- Triaspis macropteron Welw. ex Oliv.
- Triaspis mooreana Exell & Mendonça
- Triaspis mozambica A.Juss.
- Triaspis niedenzuiana Engl.
- Triaspis odorata (Willd.) A.Juss.
- Triaspis sapinii De Wild.
- Triaspis stipulata Oliv.
- Triaspis suffulta Launert

== Gallery ==
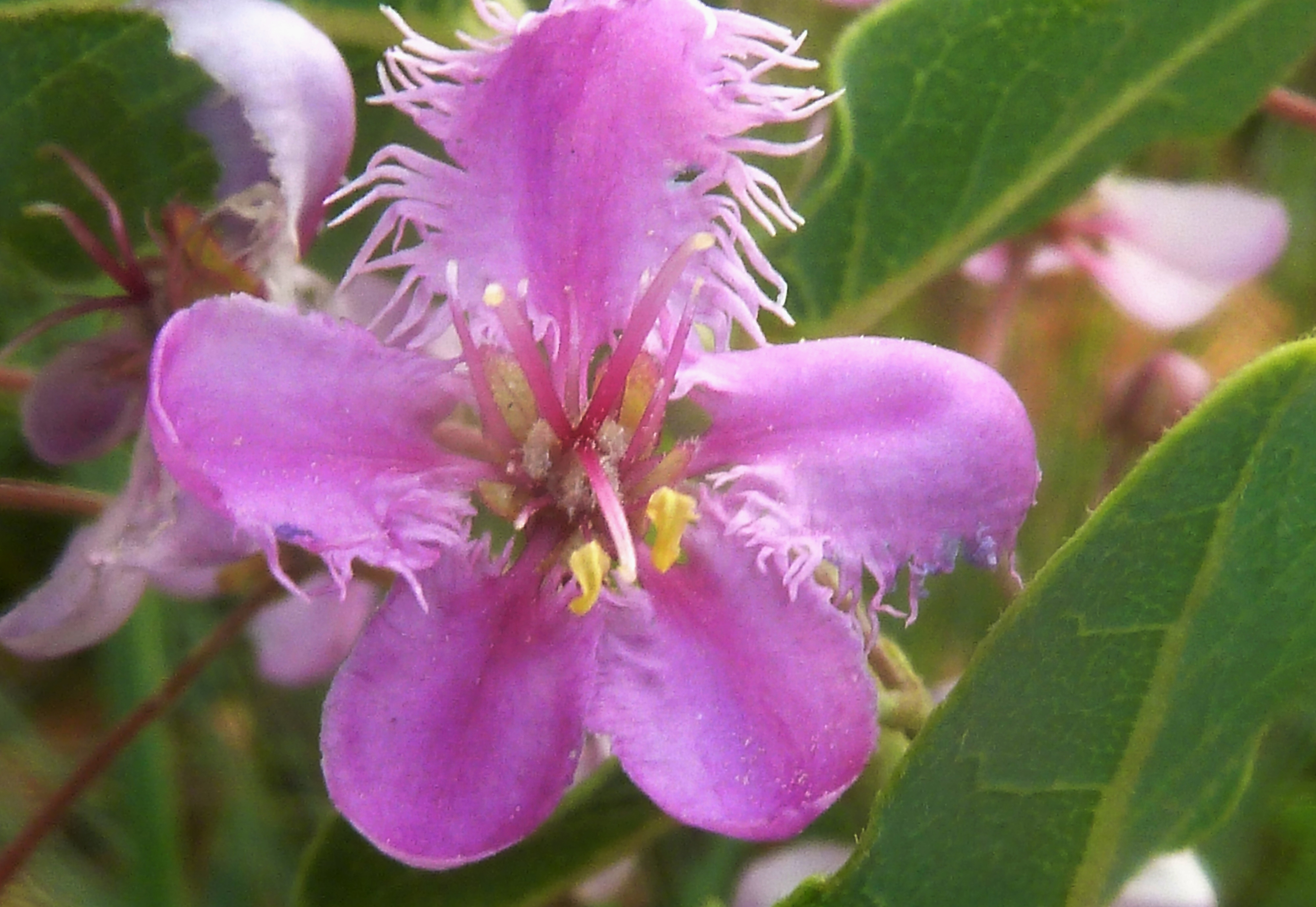
Triaspis hypericoides flower

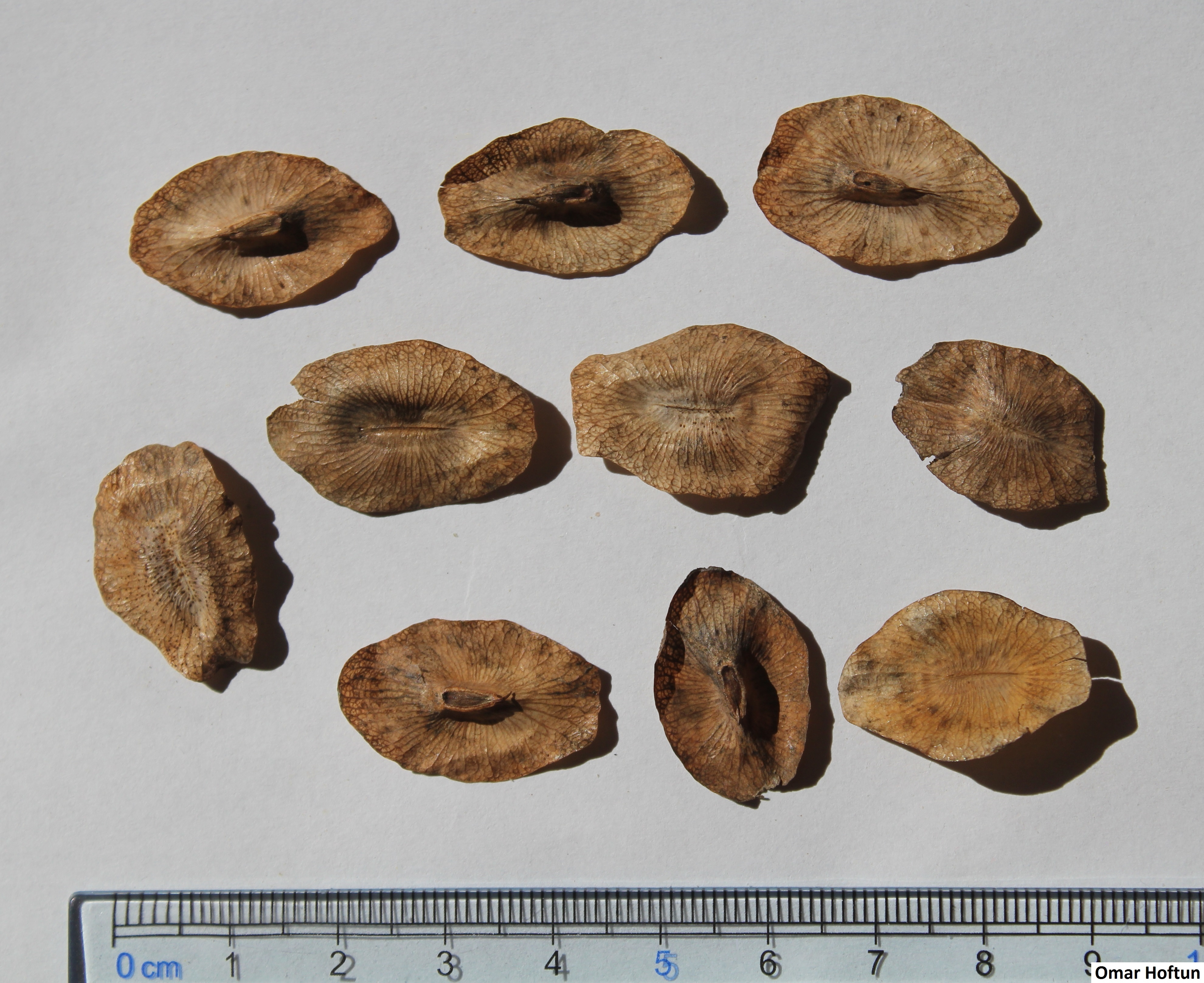
Triaspis glaucophylla seeds

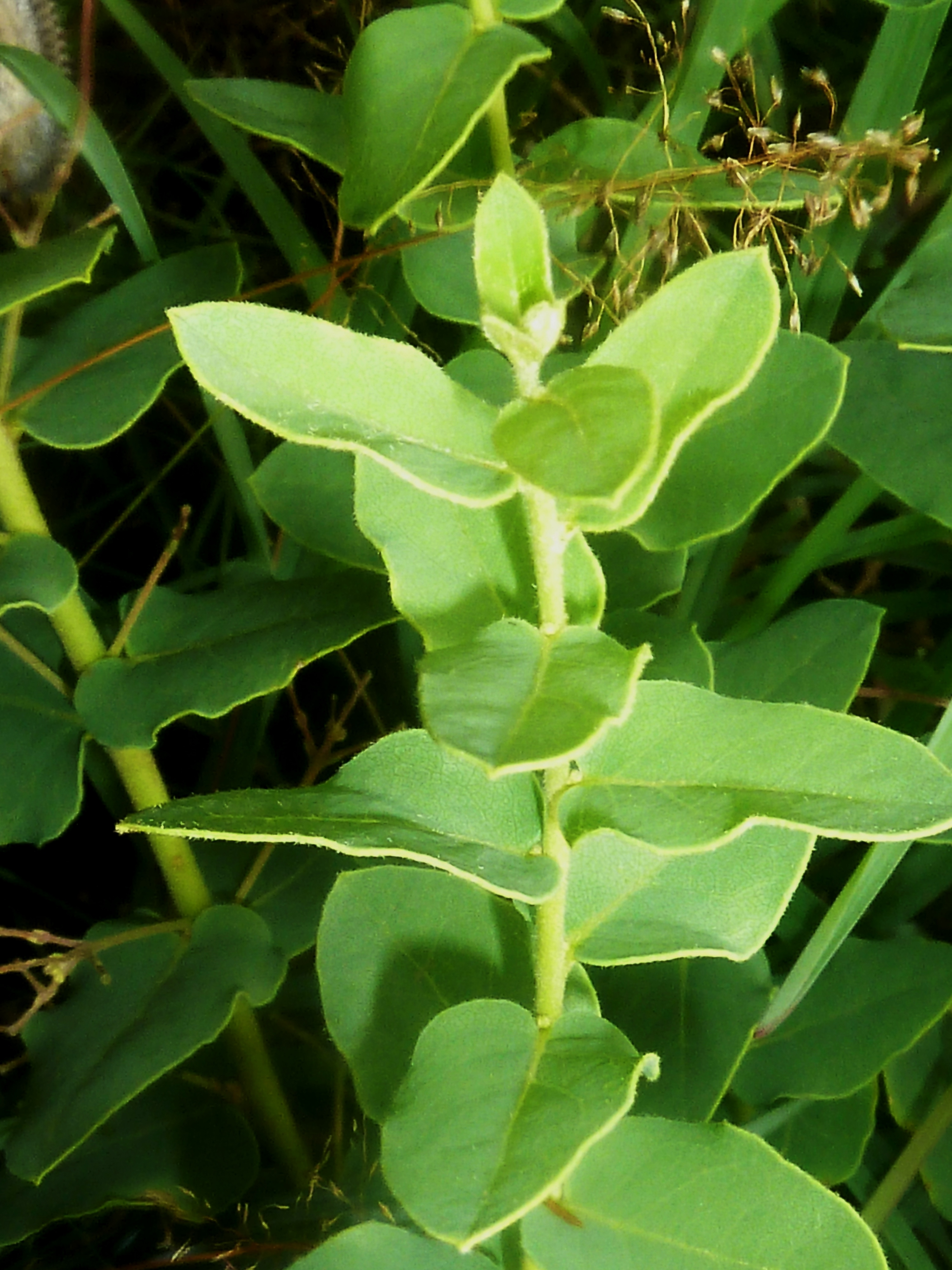
Triaspis hypericoides foliage
