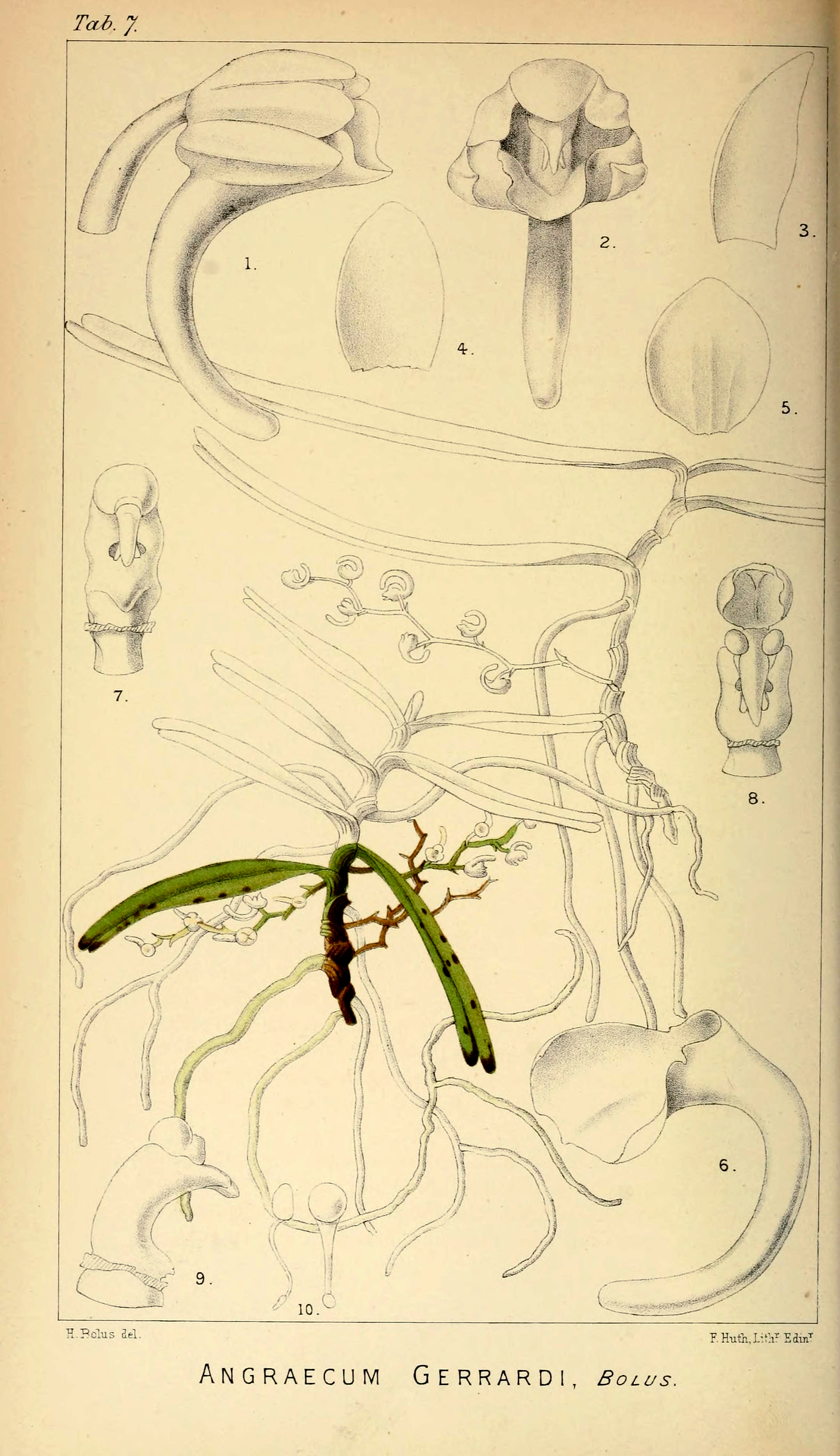

Scientific classification
- Kingdom: Plantae
- Clade: Tracheophytes
- Clade: Angiosperms
- Clade: Monocots
- Order: Asparagales
- Family: Orchidaceae
- Subfamily: Epidendroideae
- Tribe: Vandeae
- Subtribe: Angraecinae
- Genus: Rhipidoglossum; Schltr. (1918)

Synonyms
- Azadehdelia Braem (1988), nom. illeg.; Cribbia Senghas (1985); Crossangis Schltr. (1918); Margelliantha P.J.Cribb (1979); Rhaesteria Summerh. (1966); Sarcorhynchus Schltr. (1918)

= Rhipidoglossum =

Genus of orchids

Rhipidoglossum is a genus of flowering plants from the orchid family, Orchidaceae. It contains 53 species, all from sub-Saharan Africa.

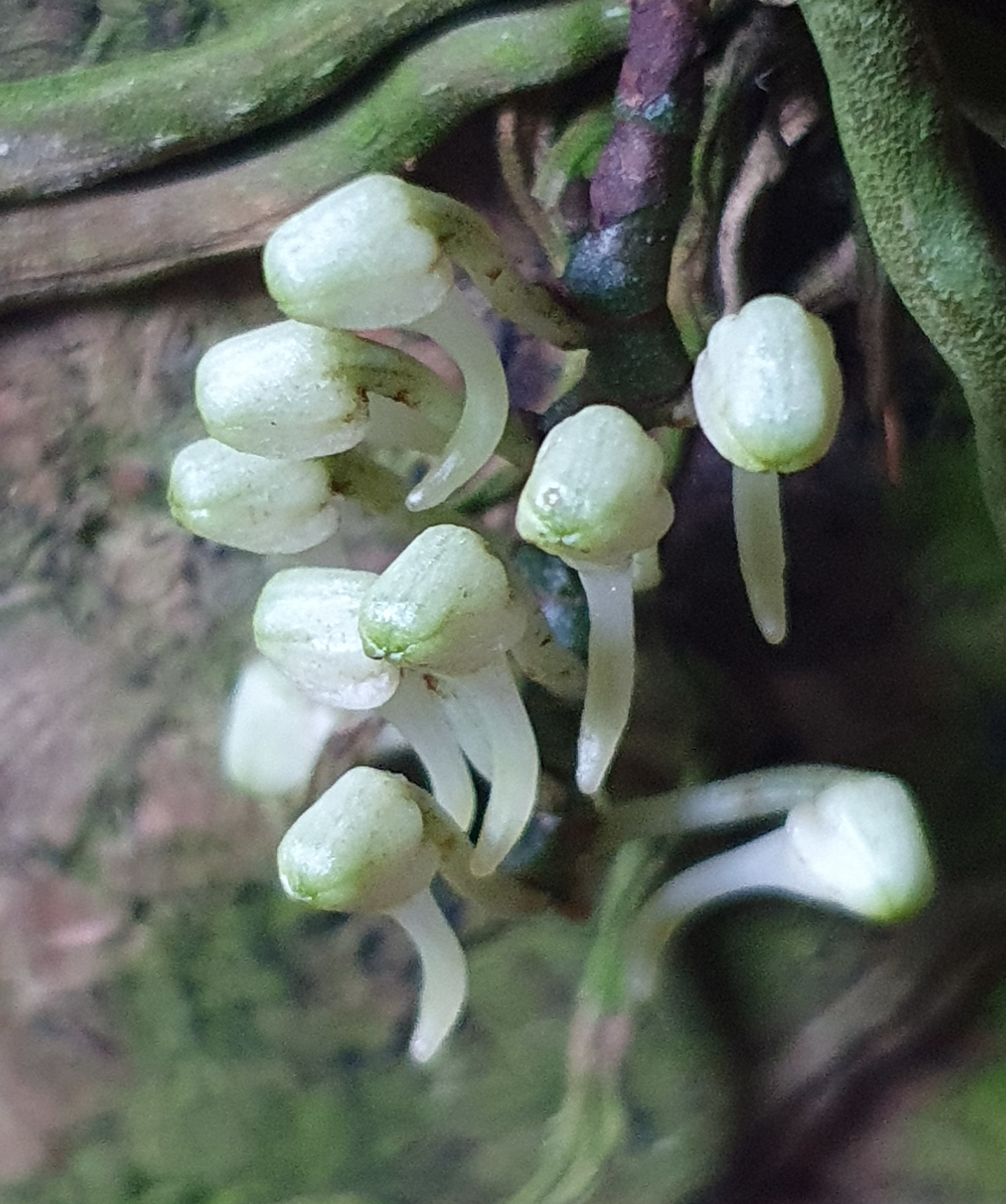
Flower buds of Rhipidoglossum millarii

== Species ==
This genus contains the following species:

- Rhipidoglossum adoxum (F.N.Rasm.) Senghas
- Rhipidoglossum afrum (Bolus) Farminhão & Stévart
- Rhipidoglossum arbonnieri (Geerinck) Eb.Fisch., Killmann, J.-P.Lebel & Delep. – grows in epiphyte forests near waterfalls
- Rhipidoglossum bilobatum (Summerh.) Szlach. & Olszewski
- Rhipidoglossum brachyceras (Summerh.) Farminhão & Stévart
- Rhipidoglossum brevifolium Summerh.
- Rhipidoglossum burttii (Summerh.) Summerh.
- Rhipidoglossum candidum (P.J.Cribb) Senghas
- Rhipidoglossum clavatum (P.J.Cribb) Farminhão & Stévart – lives in Afromontane regions
- Rhipidoglossum confusum (P.J.Cribb) Farminhão & Stévart
- Rhipidoglossum cuneatum (Summerh.) Garay
- Rhipidoglossum curvatum (Rolfe) Garay
- Rhipidoglossum delepierreanum (J.-P.Lebel & Geerinck) Eb.Fisch., Killmann, J.-P.Lebel & Delep. – native to rivers at elevations of 1,800 metres (5,900 ft) above sea level
- Rhipidoglossum densiflorum Summerh.
- Rhipidoglossum eggelingii (Summerh.) Farminhão & Stévart
- Rhipidoglossum globulare (P.J.Cribb) Farminhão & Stévart – native to Tanzania
- Rhipidoglossum globulosocalcaratum (De Wild.) Summerh.
- Rhipidoglossum kamerunense (Schltr.) Garay
- Rhipidoglossum laticalcar (J.B.Hall) Senghas
- Rhipidoglossum laxiflorum Summerh.
- Rhipidoglossum leedalii (P.J.Cribb) Farminhão & Stévart – native to Kenya and Tanzania in Eastern Africa
- Rhipidoglossum longicalcar Summerh.
- Rhipidoglossum lucieae Farminhão & P.J.Cribb
- Rhipidoglossum magnicalcar Szlach. & Olszewski
- Rhipidoglossum melianthum (P.J.Cribb) Senghas
- Rhipidoglossum microphyllum Summerh.
- Rhipidoglossum mildbraedii (Kraenzl.) Garay
- Rhipidoglossum millarii (Bolus) Farminhão & Stévart – grows on twigs in coastal forests of southeastern Cape Provinces and southwestern KwaZulu-Natal
- Rhipidoglossum montanum (Piers) Senghas
- Rhipidoglossum montealenense Descourv., Stévart & P.J.Cribb – native to costal southwest Guinea
- Rhipidoglossum obanense (Rendle) Summerh.
- Rhipidoglossum ochyrae Szlach. & Olszewski
- Rhipidoglossum orientalis (Mansf.) Szlach. & Olszewski
- Rhipidoglossum ovale (Summerh.) Garay
- Rhipidoglossum oxycentron (P.J.Cribb) Senghas
- Rhipidoglossum pareense P.J.Cribb & Hemp – native to the Pare Mountains of Tanzania
- Rhipidoglossum paucifolium D.Johanss.
- Rhipidoglossum pendulum (la Croix & P.J.Cribb) Farminhão & Stévart
- Rhipidoglossum philatelicum Farminhão & P.J.Cribb
- Rhipidoglossum polyanthum (Kraenzl.) Szlach. & Olszewski
- Rhipidoglossum polydactylum (Kraenzl.) Garay
- Rhipidoglossum pulchellum (Summerh.) Garay
- Rhipidoglossum pusillum (Summerh.) Farminhão & Stévart – a dwarf plant with a stem of 2 centimetres (0.79 in)
- Rhipidoglossum rutilum (Rchb.f.) Schltr. – native to tropical Africa
- Rhipidoglossum schimperianum (A.Rich.) Garay
- Rhipidoglossum stellatum (P.J.Cribb) Szlach. & Olszewski
- Rhipidoglossum stolzii (Schltr.) Garay
- Rhipidoglossum subsimplex (Summerh.) Garay
- Rhipidoglossum tanneri (P.J.Cribb) Senghas
- Rhipidoglossum tenuicalcar (Summerh.) Garay
- Rhipidoglossum thomense (la Croix & P.J.Cribb) Farminhão & Stévart
- Rhipidoglossum ugandense (Rendle) Garay
- Rhipidoglossum xanthopollinium (Rchb.f.) Schltr.

== See also ==
- List of Orchidaceae genera
