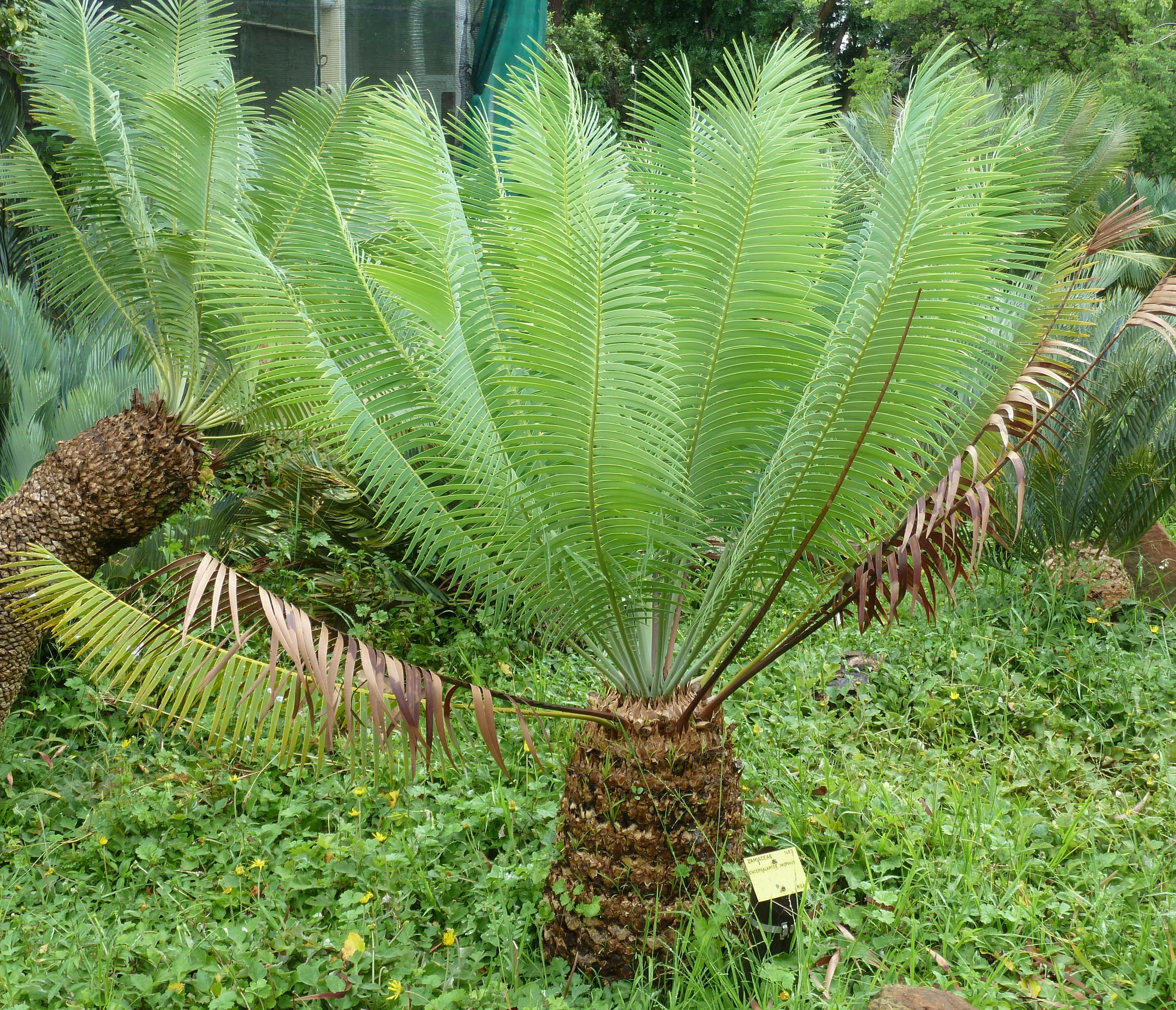

Conservation status
- Critically Endangered (IUCN 3.1)
- CITES Appendix I

Scientific classification
- Kingdom: Plantae
- Clade: Tracheophytes
- Clade: Gymnosperms
- Division: Cycadophyta
- Class: Cycadopsida
- Order: Cycadales
- Family: Zamiaceae
- Genus: Encephalartos
- Species: E. inopinus

Binomial name
- Encephalartos inopinus R.A. Dyer

= Encephalartos inopinus =

Species of cycad

Encephalartos inopinus is a species of cycad in the family Zamiaceae native to Limpopo Province, South Africa.

== Description ==
This palm-like cycad grows up to 3 metres tall with stems that are 15–25 cm in diameter. Its leaves are 80–110 cm long, either blue or semi-glossy silver. The leaflets are 14–21 cm long and 8–13 mm wide, lanceolate, and have an entire margin or sometimes with 1–2 very small teeth. They grow in pairs at a 180° angle along the rachis. The plant is dioecious, meaning it has separate male and female specimens. Male specimens have 1-3 green ovoid cones that are 18–25 cm long and 6–8 cm in diameter with green to silvery colour. Female specimens have 1-2 oval cones of the same colour, which are larger at 30–35 cm long and 12 cm in diameter. Both male and female cones are described as being silvery in colour. Both types of cones appear in January, the middle of summer in the southern hemisphere. The seeds are 20–25 mm long, 15–20 mm wide, and covered with an orange sarcotesta (similar to an aril). Both the macrosporophylls and microsporophylls have a flat, smooth, and glabrous surface.

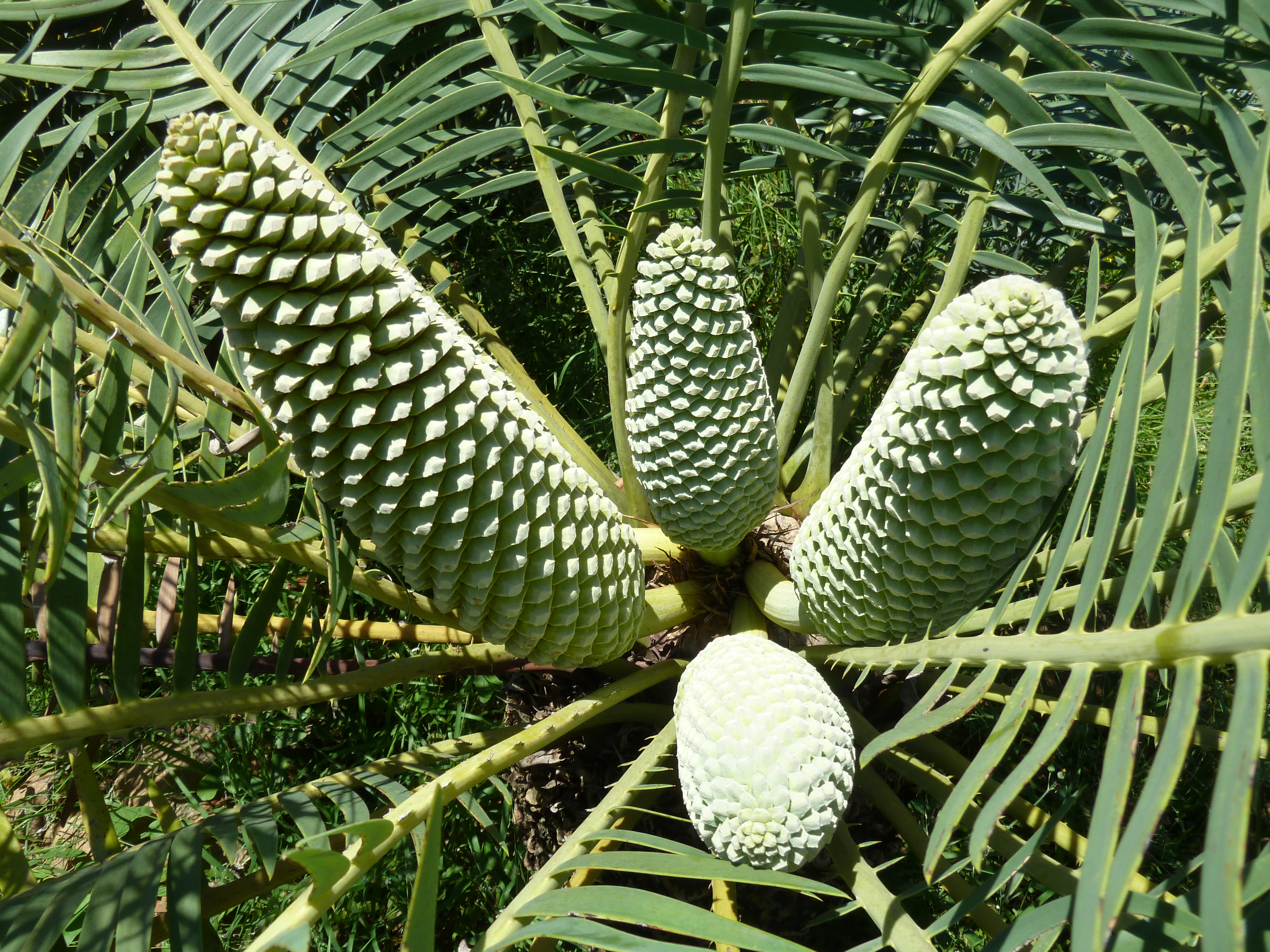
Cone

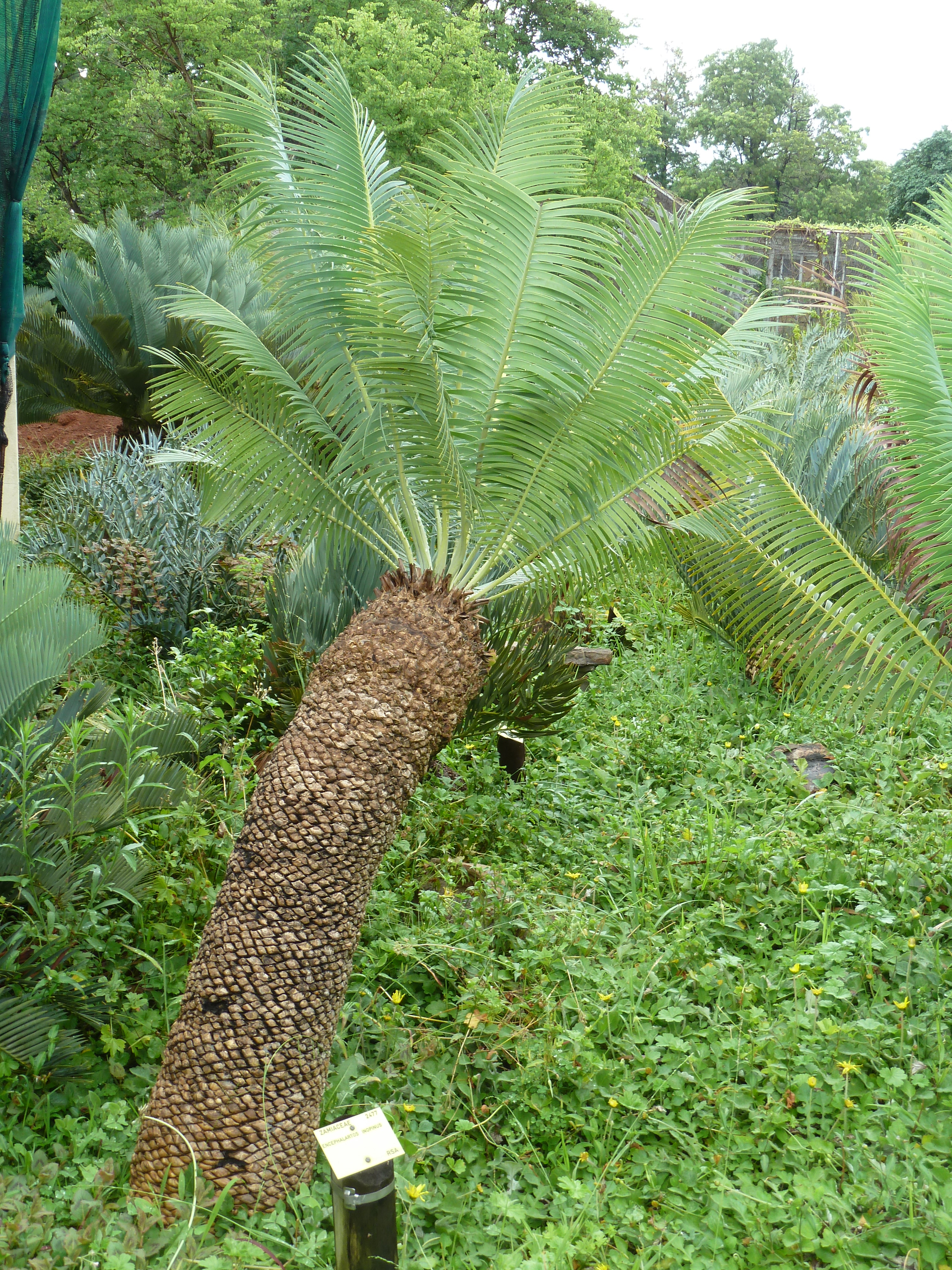
Plant

== Etymology ==
Encephalartos is from the Greek for 'bread in the head' from the practice of making a type of flour from the stems. The species name inopinus is Latin and means 'unexpected'.
