= Angalifu =

Northern white rhinoceros (1970–2014)

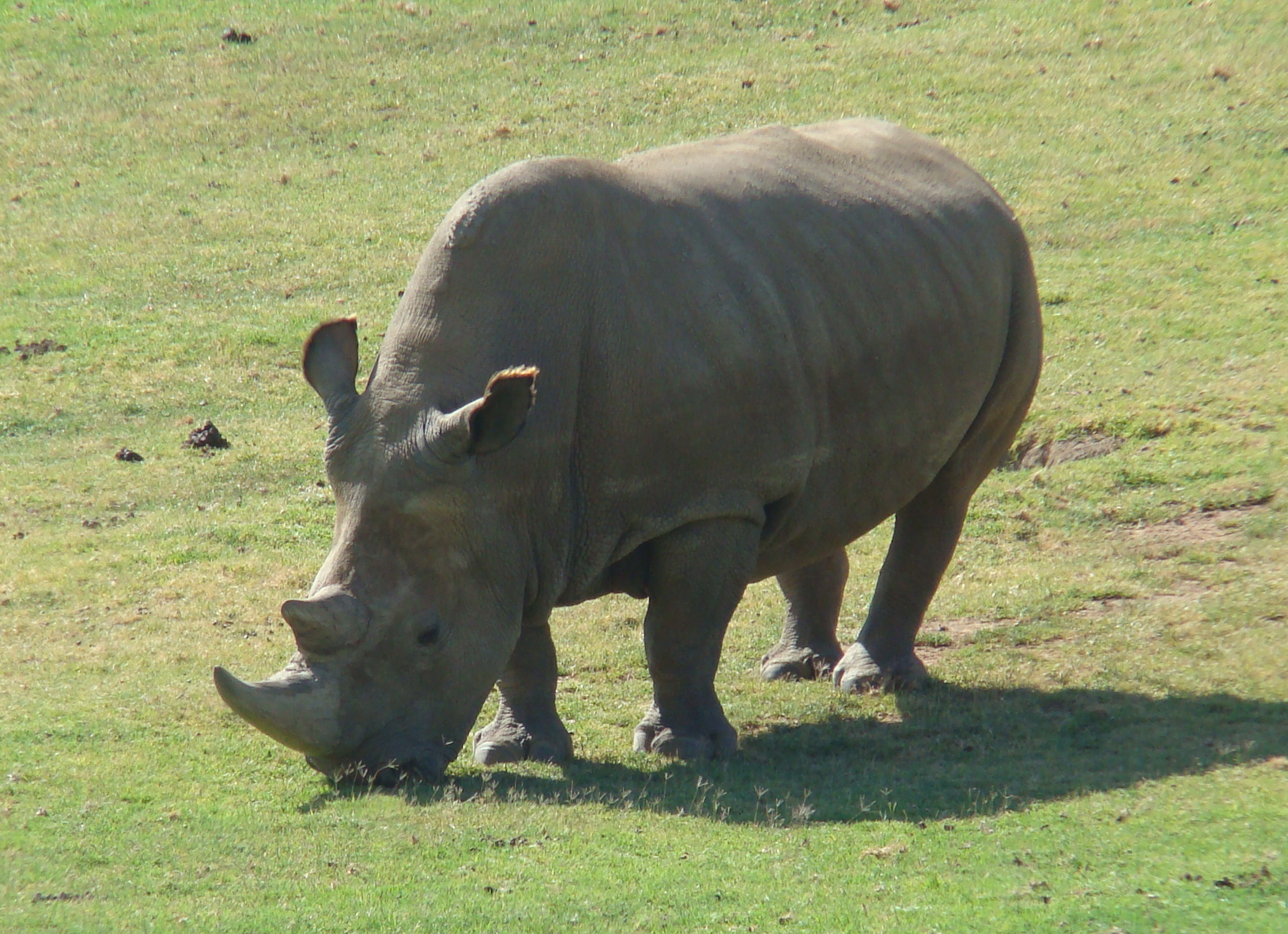
- Angalifu in his enclosure at the San Diego Zoo Safari Park
- Species: Northern white rhinoceros
- Sex: Male
- Born: c. 1970
- Died: December 14, 2014 (aged 44); San Diego Zoo Safari Park
- Resting place: Unknown
- Known for: Was one of two known males of his subspecies left in the world

Angalifu (pronounced /æŋəˈliːfu/ ang-ə-LEEF-oo; c. 1970 – December 14, 2014) was a captive northern white rhinoceros held at the San Diego Zoo Safari Park. At the time of his death, he was one of six living northern white rhinoceroses in the world, one of two living males in the world, and the only male on the American continents. He was outlived by male Sudan and females Najin and Fatu.

Angalifu was born in the wild circa 1970 before being caught and sent to the Khartoum Zoo in Khartoum, Sudan. In August 1990, he was transferred on loan to the San Diego Zoo Safari Park, where he lived until his death by natural causes on December 14, 2014, at an estimated age of 44 years.

== Background ==
The northern white rhinoceros is one of the two subspecies of the white rhinoceros. Formerly found in several countries in East and Central Africa south of the Sahara, it is considered Critically Endangered. In 2009, Dvůr Králové Zoo in the Czech Republic sent the four rhinoceroses capable of breeding out of their herd of six to the Ol Pejeta Conservancy in Laikipia County, Kenya, Africa. The move was to induce breeding habits in a more natural habitat for the animals, as mating had not occurred in the Czech Republic. On October 20, 2014, one of the males named Suni died at the Ol Pejeta Conservancy, leaving only six northern white rhinoceros left in the world and only three at the Conservancy. Of the three left at the Conservancy, Sudan was the only male left in the world until his death in Kenya on 19 March 2018, making Angalifu one of only two males in the world when he was alive.

== San Diego Zoo Safari Park ==
Angalifu was loaned to the San Diego Zoo as part of a breeding program initiated by the International Union for Conservation of Nature (IUCN) for a second captive breeding site outside of Dvůr Králové, and joined males Saut and Dinka and females Nola and Nadi in August 1990. Three of the others had arrived in 1989, when the IUCN initiative began, while Dinka was the survivor of a previous unsuccessful breeding effort at San Diego, a cooperative effort by zoos holding the only four northern white rhinoceroses in the Americas in 1972.

At the San Diego Zoo Safari Park, Angalifu roamed freely in a 213-acre habitat that is made to look like the African savanna. He was accompanied by Nola, an elderly female of the same species, who later lived in a different part of the park in the South Africa field habitat and who is now deceased as of November 2015. Angalifu lived in the Central Africa field habitat. Jane Kennedy was the lead keeper for both Angalifu and Nola.

== Breeding attempts ==
Unsuccessful attempts had been made at breeding Angalifu. Nola, his counterpart at the zoo, was found to be too old to mate. Specialists then obtained sperm from Angalifu to send to the Ol Pejeta Conservancy reserve where four adults were held (two being females), but those attempts at insemination failed. It was suspected that Angalifu was "too old" to reproduce.

== Death ==
Angalifu died from old age on December 14, 2014.

== See also ==
- Endling – Last known individual of a species or subspecies
- Extinction – Termination of a species' lineage
- Rare species – Group of organisms that are very uncommon, scarce, or infrequently encountered
- Conservation status – Indication of the chance of extinction
- Lists of extinct animals – List of extinct species
