= Sudan (rhinoceros) =

Last known male northern white rhinoceros (1973–2018)

- Sudan in 2015
- Species: Northern white rhinoceros
- Sex: Male
- Born: c. 1973; Southern Sudan, Sudan (now South Sudan)
- Died: 19 March 2018 (aged 44–45); Ol Pejeta Conservancy, Laikipia, Kenya
- Known for: Last known male of his subspecies in the world

Sudan (c. 1973 – 19 March 2018) was a captive northern white rhinoceros (Ceratotherium simum cottoni) that lived at the Safari Park Dvůr Králové in the Czech Republic from 1975 to 2009 and the rest of his life at the Ol Pejeta Conservancy in Laikipia, Kenya. At the time of his death, he was one of only three living northern white rhinoceroses in the world, and the last known male of his subspecies. Sudan was euthanised on 19 March 2018, after suffering from "age-related complications".

== Capture in Africa ==
A group of six northern white rhinoceros, including the two-year-old Sudan, were captured in Shambe, South Sudan by animal trappers employed by Chipperfield's Circus in February 1975 working under an agreement with Josef Vágner, the then-director of the Dvůr Králové Zoo in Czechoslovakia (now the Czech Republic). The captured group comprised two males (Sudan and Saut) and four females (Nola, Nuri, Nadi and Nesari).

The number of northern white rhinos was already considered to be only around 700 animals in the wild. For many environmentalists, leaving the animals in nature was the only acceptable way of preserving the already rare subspecies. The Dvůr Králové Zoo and their Chipperfield partners were then criticized for the capture. The zoo was specializing in African fauna and already had the largest collection outside of Africa.

== Life in the Czech Republic ==
In 1975 the group, including Sudan, was shipped to the Dvůr Králové Zoo for their northern white rhinoceros display. The zoo was the only one in the world where northern white rhinos had successfully given birth, with the last calf being born in 2000.

Two years later they were joined by Nasima, who originated from Uganda but came from Knowsley Safari Park near Prescot, England, and Saut was later lent to San Diego Zoo in the United States.

=== Breeding ===
After 1980, the northern white rhinos were wiped out in Uganda and Sudan, and 13 were left in Garamba National Park in Zaire (now Democratic Republic of the Congo). The Conservation Breeding Specialist Group of the IUCN met in 1986 in Dvůr Králové Zoo to discuss ways to preserve the dwindling number of northern white rhinos. The efforts to save the subspecies included the import of Ben (an older male from London) in 1986 and the return of Saut (a calf from the original 1975 group) from San Diego Zoo in 1998 to Dvůr Králové Zoo. Attempts to join the group with several southern rhinos met only with mixed success. Several surgeries were performed on the females and their eggs; genetic material, including Sudan's semen, was preserved.

=== Offspring ===
Sudan at the Ol Pejeta conservancy, June 2010

Sudan fathered three calves in the Czech Republic and became the grandfather of one. Sudan fathered Nabire (dam: Nasima, studbook number 0351), who was born on 15 November 1983, and died at Dvůr Králové Zoo in July 2015. He was also the father of Najin, who was transported to Ol Pejeta Conservancy along with him in 2009. Najin was born in 1989, again with the birth mother being Nasima. Sudan also sired one other offspring besides Nabire and Najin. The third calf was born prematurely and died. Sudan was the grandfather of Fatu through his daughter Najin. For breeding, Sudan's studbook number was 0372.

=== Breeding crisis ===
The second-to-last male northern white rhinoceros in the world was Angalifu, who lived at the San Diego Zoo Safari Park with Nola until his death on 14 December 2014. Angalifu was beyond breeding age, leaving Sudan as the only fertile male in the world.

In June 2008 specialists met in the Dvůr Králové Zoo to decide further steps to save the subspecies. The meeting of the Czech Zoo with IUCN African Rhino Specialist Group (AfRSG), World Zoo and Aquarium Association WAZA, Berlin institute IZW as well as experts from Vienna Veterinary institute and the European Zoo and Aquarium Association EAZA recommended to move Sudan and his group from the Czech Republic to Africa. Substantial debate succeeded and strong objections were raised against this proposal, especially given the fact that expert and scientific organizations were available in Europe and insemination efforts could have continued in the Czech Republic.

== Return to Kenya ==
2014 VOA report about the last three individuals

In December 2009 the rhinos were moved to the Ol Pejeta Conservancy for a "Last Chance To Survive" breeding program, along with three other northern white rhinoceroses. It was hoped that Ol Pejeta would provide a more natural habitat and better hormonal balance for the animals to induce breeding. However, breeding attempts with Sudan at Ol Pejeta Conservancy were unsuccessful.

One of the other three rhinos transported in the Ol Pejeta Conservancy, Suni, died in 2014. Sudan then lived the final years of his life with his daughter Najin and granddaughter Fatu.

Northern white rhinoceroses are guarded 24 hours a day at the conservancy to protect them from poaching, which is a major problem for rhinoceroses. The protection includes horn-embedded transmitters, watchtowers, fences, drones, guard dogs, and trained armed guards around the clock.

=== Death ===
At the end of 2017, Sudan suffered from an infection in his right hind leg. Although his condition improved in subsequent months, the infection returned, and, in March 2018, his state seriously deteriorated, despite intensive care. In the final years of his life, Sudan was protected by armed guards around the clock. He was euthanized on 19 March 2018, after suffering from "age-related complications."

In the weeks before Sudan's death, Richard Vigne, CEO of the Ol Pejeta Conservancy, stated that "Sudan has been technically infertile for many years, so him dying is not going to affect the possibilities of recovery for the northern white rhino as a species."

The skin-mount of Sudan and the skeleton of Nabire were on display in the National Museum in Prague, Czech Republic until the end of 2021.

== Scientific efforts to resurrect the subspecies ==
After the death of Sudan, Dvůr Králové Zoo spokesman Jan Stejskal declared that "We must take advantage of the unique situation in which cellular technologies are utilized for conservation of critically endangered species. It may sound unbelievable, but thanks to the newly developed techniques even Sudan could still have an offspring."

There are now ongoing attempts at in vitro fertilization of eggs from Najin and Fatu with semen from Sudan and to implant the resulting blastocysts in suitable female southern white rhinos. In total, eggs from two females and semen from five males are now available for the subspecies' possible future resurrection. The team in charge produced three embryos in 2019, which are currently kept in the laboratory. Since the two remaining female northern white rhinoceros are not suitable for carrying a pregnancy, they plan to implant the embryo into southern white rhino surrogates.

== Support ==
In February 2015, Ol Pejeta Conservancy launched a GoFundMe campaign to raise funds for the rangers guarding the rhinos. In May 2015, after contacting Ol Pejeta Conservancy, Dubai-based Pakistani entrepreneurs Hamid Hussain and Muhammad Yaqoob started a global campaign to create awareness and bring people to Ol Pejeta Conservancy to help in generating revenues for the IVF treatments and other forms of assisted reproduction by inviting celebrities to visit the conservancy. Among the celebrities who visited Sudan were actors Nargis Fakhri and Khaled Abol Naga.

In 2017, Ol Pejeta Conservancy teamed up with Tinder and Ogilvy Africa to launch a fundraising campaign in order to recover the species. They created a Tinder account for Sudan, the last standing male of northern white rhinos, and the app's users could swipe right to make their donations for the development of breeding methods.

On 20 December 2020, Google showed a Doodle on its homepage in remembrance of Sudan.

== See also ==
- Booming Ben, the last known heath hen
- George (snail), the last known Achatinella apexfulva
- Lonesome George, the last known male Pinta Island tortoise
- Incas (parakeet), last known Carolina parakeet
- Angalifu, Last Captive Northern White rhinoceros
- Endling
- Martha (passenger pigeon), the last known passenger pigeon
- Nola (rhinoceros) female Northern White rhinoceros at the San Diego Zoo
- Toughie (frog), the last known Rabbs' fringe-limbed treefrog
