= Nola (rhinoceros) =

Northern white rhinoceros (1974–2015)

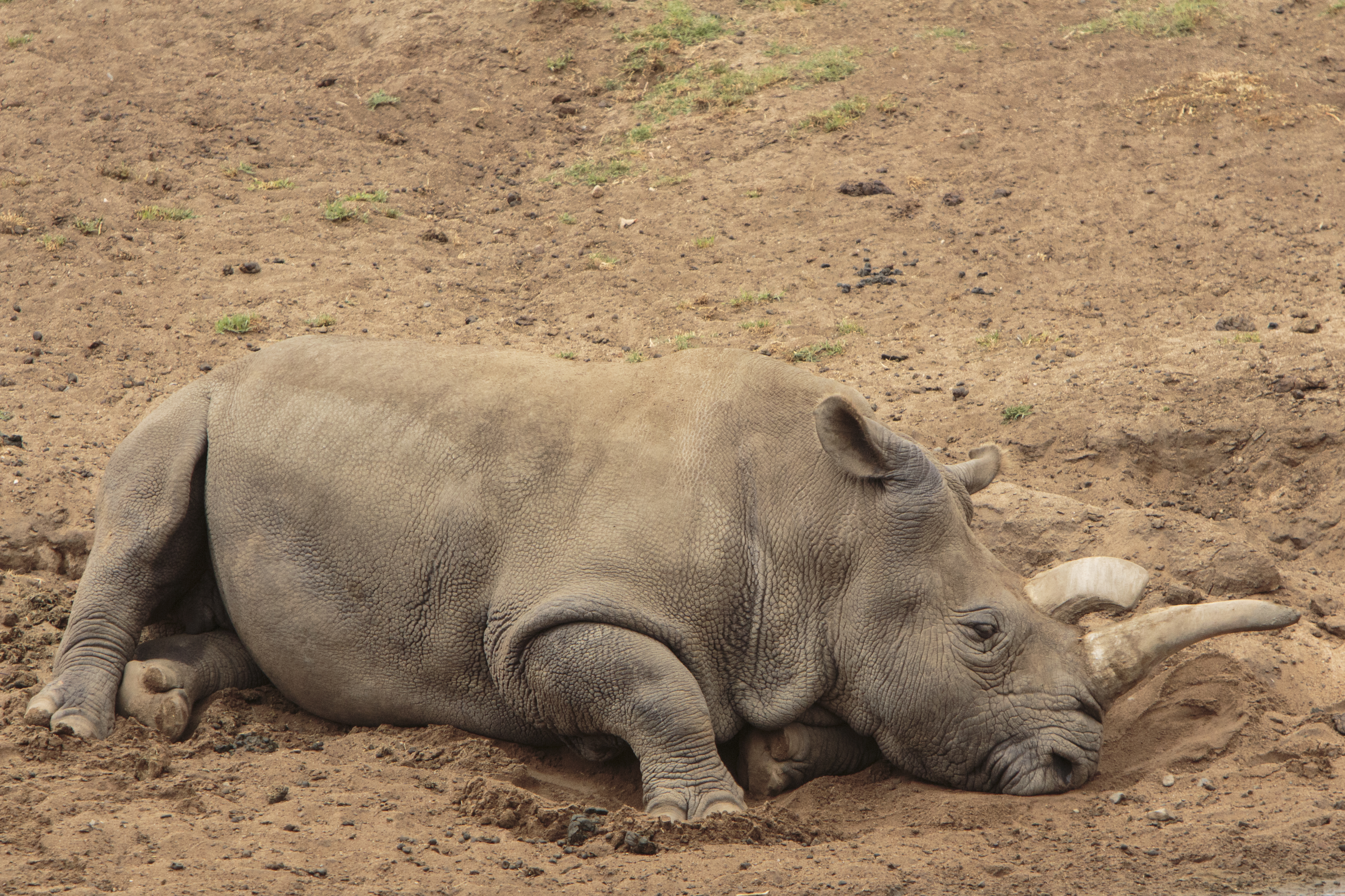
- Nola at the San Diego Zoo Safari Park
- Species: Northern white rhinoceros
- Sex: Female
- Born: August 21, 1974; Shambe area of Southern Sudan
- Died: November 22, 2015 (aged 41); San Diego Safari Park, Escondido, California, U.S.
- Known for: Last northern white rhinoceros in the United States.

Nola (August 21, 1974 – November 22, 2015) was a northern white rhinoceros who lived at the San Diego Zoo Safari Park near Escondido, California, United States. At her death, she was one of only four of her subspecies overall. She was outlived by male Sudan and females Najin and Fatu.

== Background ==
Nola was wild caught in the Shambe area, which is located "in the southern savanna woodlands of Sudan. She was rescued from the violent poaching that is prevalent in that region when she was only a few years old." Her age upon capture has been estimated more closely at being 18 months old. She belonged to the Dvůr Králové Zoo in the Czech Republic, but since 1989 she had been on loan in San Diego.

== San Diego Zoo ==
Nola lived at the San Diego Zoo Safari Park’s South Africa field habitat. She was in the same enclosure as her counterpart Angalifu, but he was moved to the Central Africa field habitat at the zoo before his death on December 14, 2014. Nola's lead keeper at the zoo was Jane Kennedy. While at the zoo, Nola had been described by PBS as "independent and aggressive".

A photographer who shot photos of Nola numerous times said, "As any rhino might, Nola enjoys her daily belly scratches and neck rubs, carrots, and the occasional bucket of apples. She spends her days indulging in the warm Southern California weather sunbathing." She shared her enclosure with other African animals, including Cape Buffalo, giraffes and gazelles. Irv Erdos, a writer for The San Diego Union-Tribune, endorsed the San Diego Zoo Global Wildlife Conservancy's mission to bring animals back from the brink of extinction, specifically mentioning Nola. Erdos said he has visited Nola "at least a dozen times."

== Breeding ==
In 1996, Nola refused advances by Angalifu, a male northern white rhino at the San Diego Zoo that staff hoped would mate. Nola was given hormones to make her more receptive to Angalifu's advances. After her food was mixed with prostaglandin, followed by a two-week daily dose of oral progesterone, Nola became receptive to Angalifu's advances and the two mated for 20-30 minutes the first time. Following that mating, the two continued to copulate, but no pregnancy resulted from the pairing.

Nola was too old to be bred at that point, and as of 2014 was considered "elderly". In 2015 she suffered from recurring abscesses on one hip.

== Death ==
Nola had been under veterinary care for a bacterial infection, as well as age-related health issues. After her health rapidly declined over the previous day, her caretakers had her euthanized on November 22, 2015.
