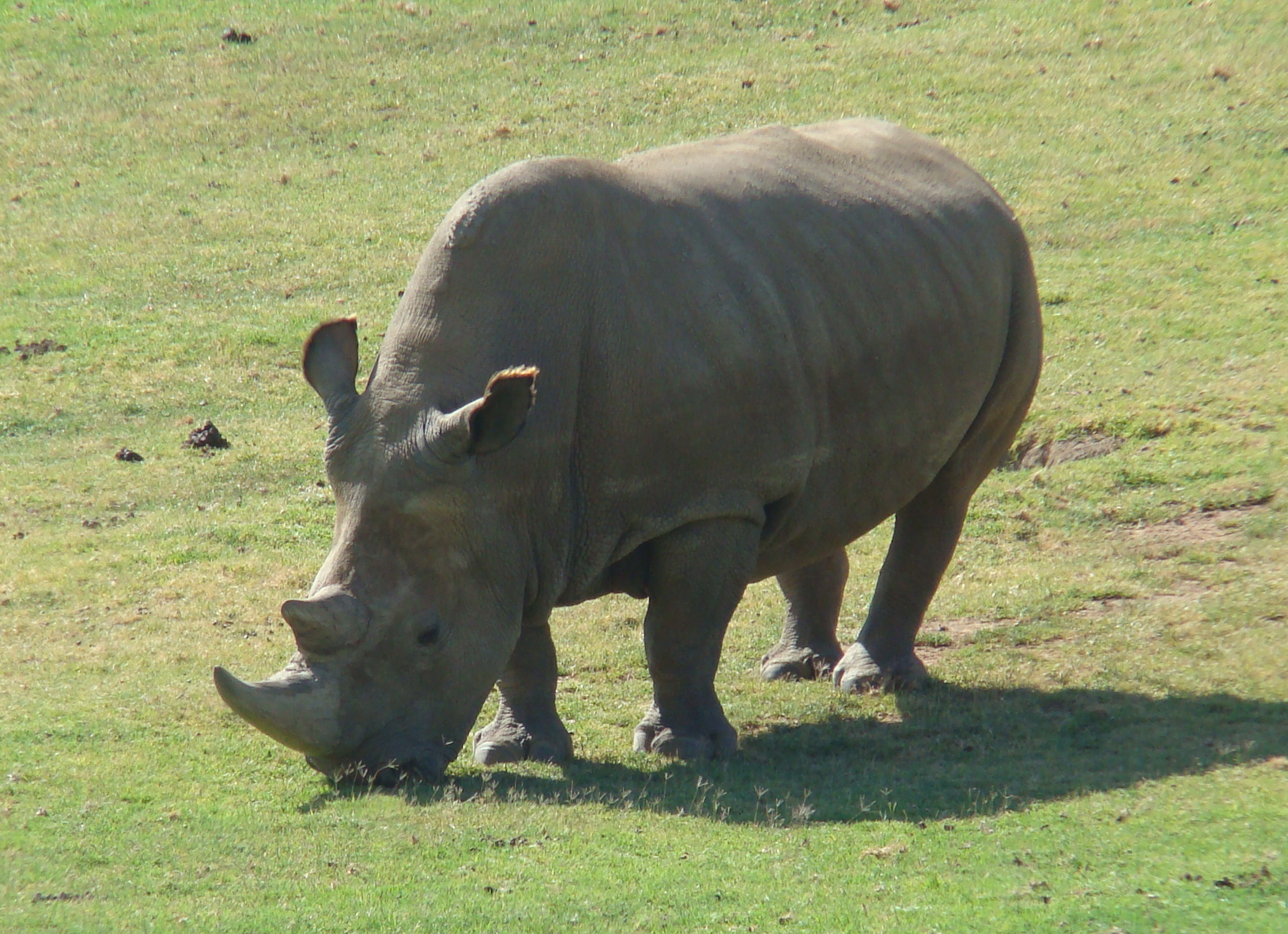
- Angalifu, a male northern white rhinoceros at the San Diego Zoo Safari Park. Angalifu died of natural causes at the age of 44 on 14 December 2014.

Conservation status
- Critically endangered, possibly extinct in the wild (IUCN 3.1)
- CITES Appendix I

Scientific classification
- Kingdom: Animalia
- Phylum: Chordata
- Class: Mammalia
- Order: Perissodactyla
- Family: Rhinocerotidae
- Genus: Ceratotherium
- Species: C. simum
- Subspecies: C. s. cottoni

Trinomial name
- Ceratotherium simum cottoni (Lydekker, 1908)
- Extant and assisted colonisation (resident) Extinct Possibly extinct

= Northern white rhinoceros =

Subspecies of white rhinoceros

The northern white rhinoceros or northern white rhino (Ceratotherium simum cottoni) is one of two subspecies of the white rhinoceros (the other being the southern white rhinoceros). This subspecies is a grazer in grasslands and savanna woodlands. Formerly found in several countries in East and Central Africa south of the Sahara, since 19 March 2018, there are only two known rhinos of this subspecies left, named Najin and Fatu, both of which are female; barring the existence of unknown or misclassified male northern white rhinos elsewhere in Africa, this makes the subspecies functionally extinct. The two female rhinos belong to the Dvůr Králové Zoo in the Czech Republic but live in the Ol Pejeta Conservancy in Kenya where they are protected by armed guards.

According to the latest International Union for Conservation of Nature (IUCN) assessment from 2020, the subspecies is considered "Critically Endangered (Possibly Extinct in the Wild)."

== Taxonomy ==
Following the phylogenetic species concept, a study in 2010 suggested the northern white rhinoceros may be an altogether different species, rather than a subspecies of white rhinoceros, in which case its correct scientific name would be Ceratotherium cottoni. According to the study, distinct morphological and genetic differences suggest the northern white rhinoceros and southern white rhinoceros have been separated for at least a million years. However, the results of this research were not universally accepted by other scientists. A study in 2016 concluded that the two populations diverged between 0.46 and 0.97 million years ago and found their mitochondrial genomes to be 1.8% divergent. Based on these findings, the study concluded that classification as a subspecies was appropriate.

== Living rhinos ==
=== Ol Pejeta Conservancy ===
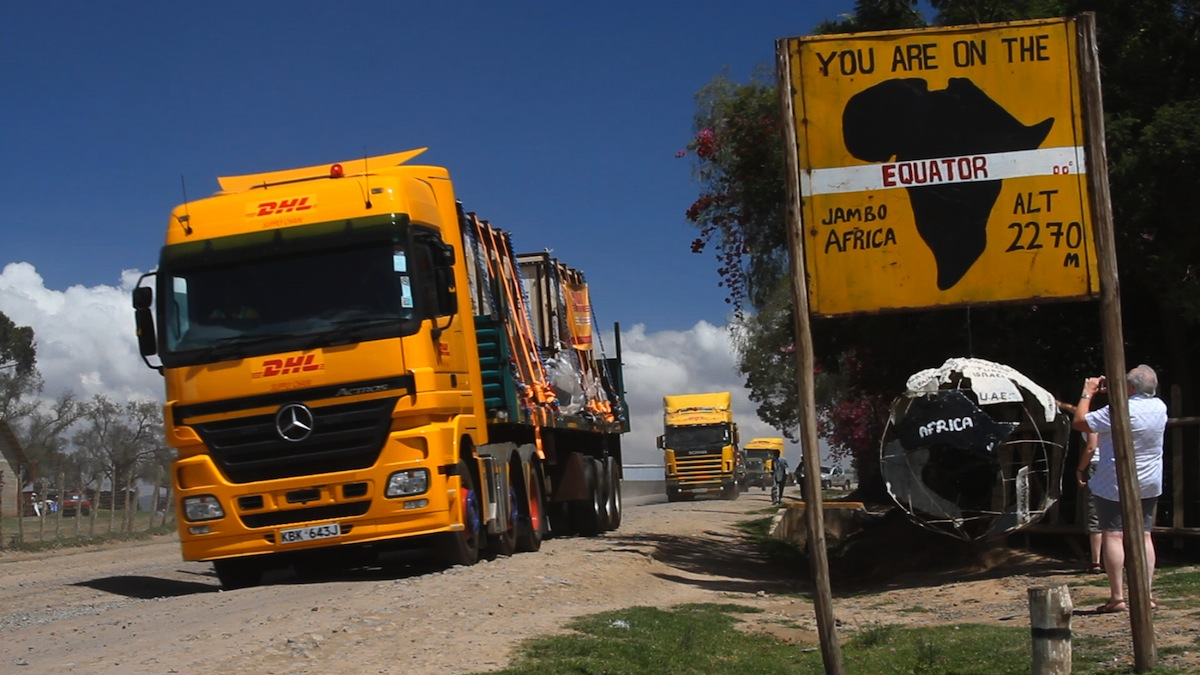
A northern white rhinoceros near the equator during translocation to Ol Pejeta Conservancy.

One of the northern white rhinos translocated to Ol Pejeta was living in a semiwild state.

2014 VOA report about the last three individuals

There are now only two northern white rhinos left in the world:

- Najin, a female, was born in captivity in 1989. She is the mother of Fatu. Her mother was Nasima and her father was Sudan.
- Fatu, also a female, was born in captivity in 2000. Her mother is Najin and her father was Saut.

They both belong to the Dvůr Králové Zoo in the Czech Republic, but live in Ol Pejeta Conservancy in Kenya, Africa. They arrived at the conservancy after an air and road trip on 20 December 2009, along with two male northern white rhinos from the Dvůr Králové Zoo, Suni and Sudan. However, Suni, a male born at Dvůr Králové Zoo in 1980, died from natural causes in Ol Pejeta Conservancy in 2014. Sudan, caught from the wild in 1975, died on 19 March 2018.

After the transport, the four rhinos were under constant watch by specialists and staff and lived in specially constructed bomas with access to a 400-by-400-metre (1,300 ft × 1,300 ft) paddock area, allowing them to acclimatize to their new surroundings. Ol Pejeta provides 24-hour armed security for the rhino enclosure. To prevent any unnecessary injuries they might inflict on each other while interacting in their fenced area, and give their horns an opportunity to regrow to a natural shape (as their front horns had grown bent from excessive rubbing against enclosure bars in captivity), all the rhinos were sedated and their horns were sawn off. This also made them less vulnerable to the poaching that drove their species to the brink of extinction, as the horn is what the poachers are after. In place of their horns, radio transmitters were installed to allow closer monitoring of their whereabouts. They are protected round-the-clock by armed guards. Poachers have been selling their horns for $110,000 per kilogram ($50,000 per pound).

Since May 2010, the northern white rhino male Sudan was moved from the initial holding pens to a much larger 700-acre (2.8 km^{2}) semiwild enclosure. There he roamed among many African animals, including several southern white rhino females and many plains animals. On 26 October 2011, the females were coaxed into the larger enclosure.

Until 2011, the progress of this attempt at saving the northern white rhinoceros was documented on the initiative's website; and their life in Ol Pejeta Conservancy is commented on the Conservancy's website. Several documentaries are in the works, including an episode of Ol Pejeta Diaries titled "Return of the African Titans" for Oasis HD Canada in fall 2010, and a follow-up half-hour episode to follow. This translocation was also the subject of a special edition of the BBC's Last Chance to See, titled "Return of the Rhino", presented by Stephen Fry and the zoologist Mark Carwardine.

On 25 April 2012, and on 27 May 2012, Suni and Najin mated. Pregnancy of the female rhinos was monitored weekly. Rhinoceros gestation takes 16 to 18 months, so in January 2014 the Conservancy considered Najin not pregnant, and a male southern white rhino from Lewa Wildlife Conservancy was put to Najin and Fatu enclosure in Ol Pejeta to at least intercross the subspecies. To achieve this, both female northern white rhinos were separated from their male counterparts, which prevented them from producing a pure northern white rhino offspring. In 2015, however, tests conducted by Czech specialists revealed that neither of the females are "capable of natural reproduction". According to the director of the Dvůr Králové Zoo, it was possible Najin became pregnant but miscarried shortly thereafter, which resulted in pathological changes in her uterus, preventing another impregnation.

=== Assisted reproduction ===
At the end of 2015, scientists from the Leibniz Institute for Zoo and Wildlife Research, San Diego Zoo Global, Tiergarten Schönbrunn, and Dvůr Králové Zoo developed a plan to reproduce northern white rhinos using natural gametes of the living rhinos and induced pluripotent stem cells. Subsequently, in the future, it might be possible to specifically mature the cells into specific cells such as neurons and muscle cells, in a similar way in which Katsuhiko Hayashi has grown mouse oocytes out of simple skin cells. The DNA of a dozen northern white rhinos has been preserved in genetic banks in Berlin and San Diego.

In August 2019, ten egg cells (five from Najin and five from Fatu) were harvested to be artificially inseminated with the frozen sperm of a northern white rhino as part of a project by the Leibniz Institute for Zoo and Wildlife Research, Dvůr Králové Zoo, Kenya Wildlife Service, and Avantea. In September 2019, scientists announced that they fertilized in vitro the eggs with frozen sperm taken from dead males; two of the resulting embryos were viable. In January 2020, it was announced that another embryo was created using the same techniques; all three embryos are from Fatu. These embryos are being stored in liquid nitrogen until they can be placed into a surrogate mother, probably a southern white rhino. In December 2020, 14 egg cells were retrieved from Fatu; eight of them were fertilised by the sperm of the dead northern white rhino Suni, resulting in two viable embryos. No egg cells were retrieved from Najin. As of 2025, there are 38 northern white rhino embryos that have been created by BioRescue. The embryos are cryopreserved in labs in Berlin, Germany and Cremona, Italy. The BioRescue team successfully implanted a southern white rhino embryo in a southern white rhino surrogate named Curra in 2023 in a complicated procedure, but Curra died in November due to a rare bacterial infection. Efforts to reproduce the pregnancy with a northern white rhino embryo are ongoing.

== Recently deceased rhinos ==
Northern white rhinos

=== Wild population ===
The northern white rhino formerly ranged over parts of northwestern Uganda, southern South Sudan, the eastern part of Central African Republic, and northeastern Democratic Republic of the Congo. Their range possibly extended as far west as Lake Chad, into Chad and Cameroon.

Poachers reduced their population from 500 to 15 in the 1970s and 1980s. From the early 1990s through mid-2003, the population recovered to more than 32 animals. Since mid-2003, poaching has intensified and further reduced the wild population.

==== Garamba National Park ====
The last known surviving population of wild northern white rhinos was in Garamba National Park, Democratic Republic of the Congo (DRC).

In January 2005, the government of the DRC approved a two-part plan for five northern white rhinos to be moved from Garamba National Park to a wildlife sanctuary in Kenya. The second part commits the government and its international partners to increase conservation efforts in Garamba, so the northern white rhinos can be returned when it is safe again. However, the translocation did not occur.

In August 2005, ground and aerial surveys conducted under the direction of African Parks Foundation and the African Rhino Specialist Group (ARSG) had only found four animals, a solitary adult male and a group of one adult male and two adult females. They were the last known wild northern white rhinos, according to the World Wide Fund for Nature.

In June 2008, it was reported that the species may have gone extinct in the wild, since there has been no sighting of these four known remaining individuals since 2006, or of their signs since 2007, despite intensive systematic ground and aerial searches in 2008. One carcass has been found. On 28 November 2009, two Russian helicopter pilots reported seeing rhinoceroses in southern Sudan. It was assumed that the three rhinos that were spotted belonged to the northern white rhinoceros subspecies, as black rhinos had not lived in the area for a long time and southern white rhinos never lived in southern Sudan. However, as of August 2011, no other sightings have been reported, and this population is now considered to have probably gone extinct.

=== Captive population ===
At the beginning of 2015, the fully captive northern white rhino population consisted of only two animals maintained in two zoological institutions: in the United States (San Diego Zoo Safari Park) and the Czech Republic (Dvůr Králové Zoo). However, both of them died later the same year, and no zoo in the world has northern white rhinos.

==== Dvůr Králové Zoo ====
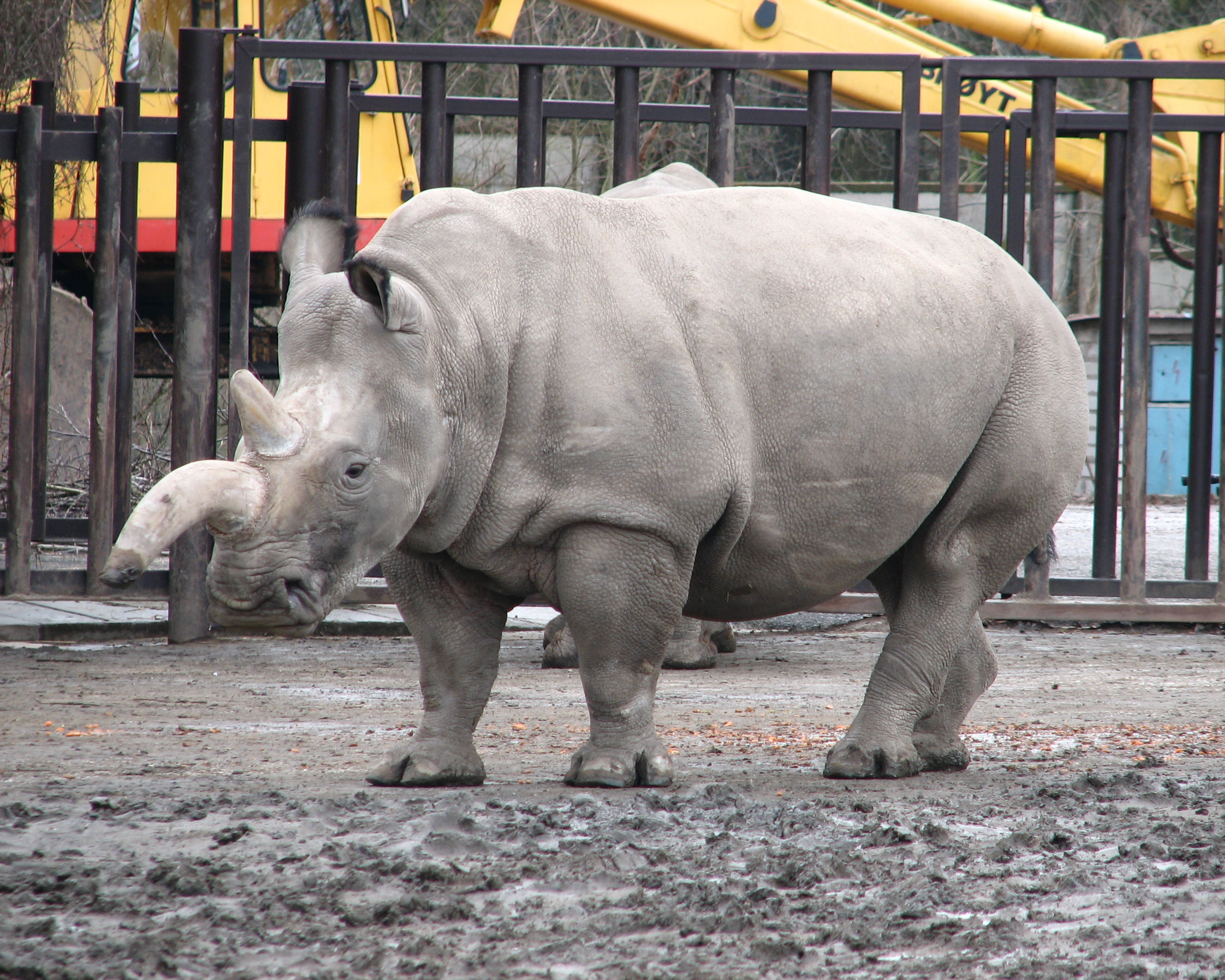
A northern white rhinoceros with an Einiosaurus-like horn at the Dvůr Králové Zoo

In 1975, the Dvůr Králové Zoo, located in Dvůr Králové nad Labem, Czech Republic, got six northern white rhinos from Sudan and, in later years, two more from English zoos. One rhino from an English zoo arrived pregnant. The Dvůr Králové Zoo is the only zoo in the world where northern white rhinos birthed offspring, with the last calf being born in 2000; the current world population consists of their shared descendants.

Former residents include:

- Ben, a male wild born in Africa in about 1951. He was transferred to Dvůr Králové Zoo from a faculty in England and died 25 June 1990.
- Nasima, a female wild born in Uganda in about 1965. She was transferred pregnant to Dvůr Králové Zoo from a faculty in England. She was the mother of Nasi, Suni, Nabire, and Najin. She birthed four out of five Northern White Rhino calves born in captivity, making her the most fruitful Northern White in captivity to date. She died in 1992 at about age 27.
- Saut, a male caught from the wild in Sudan in 1975 at about 3 years of age. He was the father of Suni and Fatu. He was loaned to San Diego Zoo Safari Park by Dvůr Králové Zoo from 1989 until 1998 when he was returned to Dvůr Králové Zoo. He mated with females at both faculties. He died in August 2006, aged around 33.
- Nuri, a female caught from the wild in Sudan in 1975 at about 3 years of age. She died on 4 January 1982, aged about 10.
- Nesari, a female caught from the wild in Sudan in 1975 at about 3 years of age. She died in 2011 at the age of 39.
- Nasi, a female born at Dvůr Králové Zoo on 11 November 1977. Her mother was Nasima and her father was a southern white rhino, which made her a northern and southern white rhino hybrid. She died in 2008, aged about 31.
- Suni, a male born at Dvůr Králové Zoo on 8 June 1980. His mother was Nasima and his father was Saut, making him a half-brother of Najin and Fatu. He had mated while in zoos, and was transferred to Ol Pejeta Conservancy in 2009. Some of his sperm was collected and frozen. On 17 October 2014, he died of natural causes.
- Nabire, born at Dvůr Králové Zoo on 15 November 1983. Her mother was Nasima and her father was Sudan. She died on 27 July 2015.
- Sudan, caught from the wild in Sudan in 1975 at about 3 years of age. He was the father of Najin and Nabire. In March 2018, his state seriously deteriorated despite intensive care, due to a recurrent infection in his right hind leg, and he was euthanized on 19 March 2018. He was the last known male of the subspecies.

Dvůr Králové Zoo sent Suni, Sudan and two females, which are still alive, to the Ol Pejeta Conservancy in Kenya on 19 December 2009 in a joint effort by the zoo, Fauna and Flora International, Back to Africa, Lewa, and Kenya Wildlife Service. Hoping to stimulate the rhinos' sexual appetite, the zoo decided to send them back into their natural habitat in Kenya. The agreement with the Kenyan government expects the rhinos never to be returned to the Czech Republic.

The female named Nabire stayed in Dvůr Králové Zoo, because, as Jan Stejskal, a projects coordinator at the zoo, stated, "she is no longer capable of breeding naturally. But it seems she has one healthy ovary and this could provide us with material from which to create an embryo in artificial conditions." Efforts to do so began in autumn 2014. Immediately after the death of Nabire in 2015, her ovary with four oocytes was removed and transferred to a laboratory in Cremona, Italy. The laboratory was able to extract two egg cells and fertilise them. However, without consulting the Dvůr Králové Zoo, the semen of a southern white rhino was used instead of a northern white rhino, which the zoo considers a wasted opportunity. Nevertheless, the experiment showed that viable hybrid embryos of the northern and southern white rhino are possible through IVF, as well as a path to the creation of pure northern white rhino embryos.

==== San Diego Zoo Safari Park ====
The San Diego Zoo Safari Park in San Diego, California, had eight wild-caught northern white rhinos.

Former residents include:

- Dinka, a male caught from the wild in Sudan in 1957 at about 5 years of age, which arrived from another U.S. zoo in 1972. He died in 1974.
- Bill, a male caught from the wild in Sudan in 1956 at about 4 years of age, which arrived from another U.S. zoo in 1972. He died in 1975.
- Lucy, a female caught from the wild in Sudan in 1956 at about 4 years of age, which arrived from another U.S. zoo in 1972. She died in 1979.
- Joyce, a female caught from the wild in Sudan in 1957 at about 5 years of age, which arrived from another U.S. zoo in 1972. She died in 1996.
- Saut, a male caught from the wild in Sudan in 1975 at about 3 years of age, which was on loan from Dvůr Králové Zoo from 1989 to 1998. He died in August 2006 at about age 33.
- Nadi, a female caught from the wild in Sudan in 1975 at about 3 years of age, which was on loan since 1989 from Dvůr Králové Zoo. She died on 30 May 2007 at about age 35.
- Angalifu, a male caught from the wild in Sudan in 1973 at about 1 year of age, which was on loan since 1990 from Khartoum Zoo in Khartoum. He died on 14 December 2014 at about age 42.
- Nola, a female caught from the wild in Sudan in 1975 at about 1 year of age, which was on loan since 1989 from Dvůr Králové Zoo. She died on 22 November 2015 at about age 41.

The San Diego Wild Animal Park provided Angalifu's semen to female rhinos at the Dvůr Králové Zoo but the insemination attempts were unsuccessful. The only reproductive animals of this subspecies were transported to Ol Pejeta Conservancy in Kenya.

In 2016, it was reported that scientists were exploring alternatives (such as artificial insemination, in vitro fertilization and embryo transfer) to develop northern white rhino embryos and implant them in female southern white rhinos at the San Diego Zoo.

==== List of known captive northern white rhinoceros ====
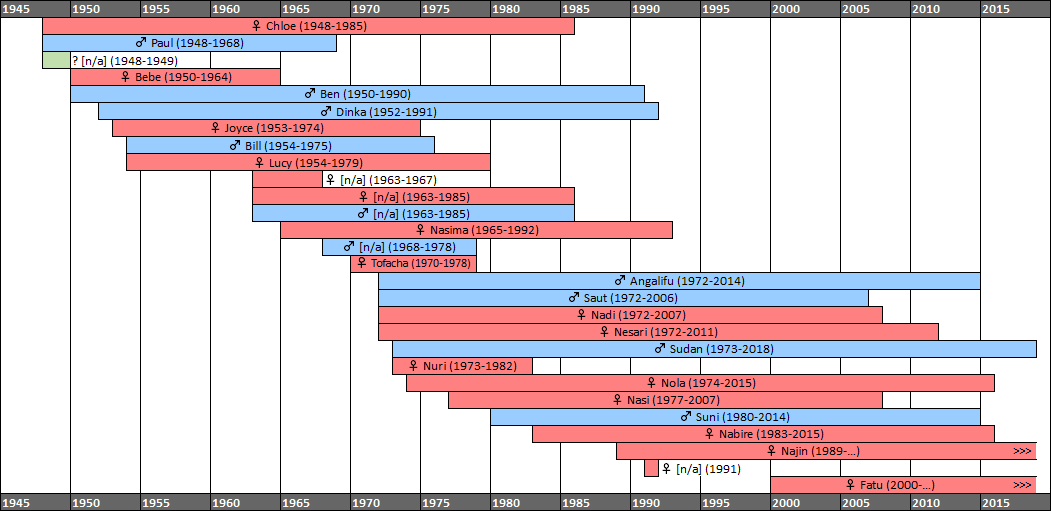
Timeline of known northern white rhinoceros in captivity

List of known northern white rhinoceros in captivity (updated 2011)
| Stud # | Sex | Name | Date of birth | Place of birth | Date of death | Place of death |
|---|---|---|---|---|---|---|
| 15 | M | Paul | 1948-08-07 | Sudan | 1968-04-13 | Antwerp Zoo |
| 16 | F | Chloe | 1948-06-07 | Sudan | 1985-08-07 | Antwerp Zoo |
| 19 | M | Ben | 1950-07-25 | Uganda | 1990-06-25 | Dvůr Králové Zoo |
| 27 | M | Bill | 1954-03-04 | Sudan | 1975-05-02 | San Diego Zoo Safari Park |
| 28 | F | Lucy | 1954-03-04 | Sudan | 1979-03-15 | San Diego Zoo Safari Park |
| 54 | M | [n/a] | 1963-04-01 | Sudan | 1985-12-31 | Riyadh National Zoo |
| 55 | F | [n/a] | 1963-04-01 | Sudan | 1985-12-31 | Riyadh National Zoo |
| 74 | M | Dinka | 1952-07-28 | South Sudan | 1991-01-28 | San Diego Zoo Safari Park |
| 75 | F | Joyce | 1953-01-28 | South Sudan | 1974-08-15 | San Diego Zoo Safari Park |
| 290 | F | Bebe | 1950-07-01 | Uganda | 1964-05-29 | Zoological Society of London |
| 345 | F | Tofacha | 1970-01-01 | Sudan | 1978-09-12 | Al Ain Zoo |
| 347 | M | [n/a] | 1968-04-01 | Sudan | 1978-01-18 | Khartoum Zoo |
| 348 | M | Angalifu | 1972-04-01 | Sudan | 2014-12-14 | San Diego Zoo Safari Park |
| 351 | F | Nasima | 1965-07-01 | Uganda | 1992-08-28 | Dvůr Králové Zoo |
| 372 | M | Sudan | 1973-09-19 | Sudan | 2018-03-19 | Ol Pejeta Conservancy |
| 373 | M | Saut | 1972-09-19 | Sudan | 2006-08-14 | Dvůr Králové Zoo |
| 374 | F | Nola | 1974-09-19 | Sudan | 2015-11-22 | San Diego Zoo Safari Park |
| 375 | F | Nuri | 1973-09-19 | Sudan | 1982-01-04 | Dvůr Králové Zoo |
| 376 | F | Nadi | 1972-09-19 | Sudan | 2007-05-30 | San Diego Zoo Safari Park |
| 377 | F | Nesari | 1972-09-19 | Sudan | 2011-05-26 | Dvůr Králové Zoo |
| 476 | F | Nasi | 1977-11-11 | Dvůr Králové Zoo | 2007-07-20 | Dvůr Králové Zoo |
| 630 | M | Suni | 1980-06-08 | Dvůr Králové Zoo | 2014-10-18 | Ol Pejeta Conservancy |
| 789 | F | Nabire | 1983-11-15 | Dvůr Králové Zoo | 2015-07-27 | Dvůr Králové Zoo |
| 943 | F | Najin | 1989-07-11 | Dvůr Králové Zoo | | |
| 1122 | F | [n/a] | 1991-07-18 | Dvůr Králové Zoo | 1991-07-18 | Dvůr Králové Zoo |
| 1123 | F | [n/a] | 1963-04-01 | Sudan | 1967-08-02 | Khartoum Zoo |
| 1252 | ? | [n/a] | 1948-11-17 | Sudan | 1949-01-29 | Khartoum Zoo |
| 1305 | F | Fatu | 2000-06-29 | Dvůr Králové Zoo | | |

== Population chart ==
Northern White Rhino Population by Location and Year, 1909–2019
| Location | 1909 | 1960* | 1975* | 1984 | 1995 | 1996 | 1998 | 2000 | 2003 | 2006 | 2007 | 2008 | 2009 | 2011 | 2014 | 2015 | 2017 | 2018 | 2019 |
| Wild | 2,000–3,000* | 2,000* | 500* | 15 | 35 | 29 | 26–31 | 30–36 | 30 | 4 | n/a | 0 | 0 | 0 | 0 | 0 | 0 | 0 | 0 |
|---|---|---|---|---|---|---|---|---|---|---|---|---|---|---|---|---|---|---|---|
| Central African Republic | n/a | n/a | n/a | 0 | 0 | 0 | 0 | 0 | 0 | 0 | 0 | 0 | 0 | 0 | 0 | 0 | 0 | 0 | 0 |
| Dem. Republic of Congo | n/a | n/a | n/a | 15 | 35 | 29 | 26–31 | 30–36 | 30 | 4 | n/a | 0 | 0 | 0 | 0 | 0 | 0 | 0 | 0 |
| South Sudan | n/a | n/a | n/a | 0 | 0 | 0 | 0 | 0 | 0 | 0 | 0 | 0 | 0 | 0 | 0 | 0 | 0 | 0 | 0 |
| Uganda | n/a | n/a | n/a | 0 | 0 | 0 | 0 | 0 | 0 | 0 | 0 | 0 | 0 | 0 | 0 | 0 | 0 | 0 | 0 |
| Captivity | n/a | 7 | 15 | 16 | 11 | 10 | 10 | 11 | 11 | 10 | 8 | 8 | 8 | 7 | 5 | 3 | 3 | 2 | 2 |
| Dvůr Králové Zoo, Czech Republic | n/a | 0 | 6 | 9 | 6 | 6 | 7 | 8 | 8 | 7 | 6 | 6 | 2 | 1 | 1 | 0 | 0 | 0 | 0 |
| Khartoum Zoo, Sudan | n/a | 0 | 2 | 1 | 0 | 0 | 0 | 0 | 0 | 0 | 0 | 0 | 0 | 0 | 0 | 0 | 0 | 0 | 0 |
| Ol Pejeta; Conservancy, Kenya | n/a | 0 | 0 | 0 | 0 | 0 | 0 | 0 | 0 | 0 | 0 | 0 | 4 | 4 | 3 | 3 | 3 | 2 | 2 |
| San Diego Zoo, USA | n/a | 0 | 2 | 1 | 5 | 4 | 3 | 3 | 3 | 3 | 2 | 2 | 2 | 2 | 1 | 0 | 0 | 0 | 0 |
| Other zoo faculties | n/a | 7 | 5 | 5 | 0 | 0 | 0 | 0 | 0 | 0 | 0 | 0 | 0 | 0 | 0 | 0 | 0 | 0 | 0 |
| Total | 2,000–3,000* | 2,000* | 500* | 31 | 46 | 39 | 36–41 | 41–47 | 41 | 14 | 8 | 8 | 8 | 7 | 5 | 3 | 3 | 2 | 2 |

*estimate
