= Josef Vágner =

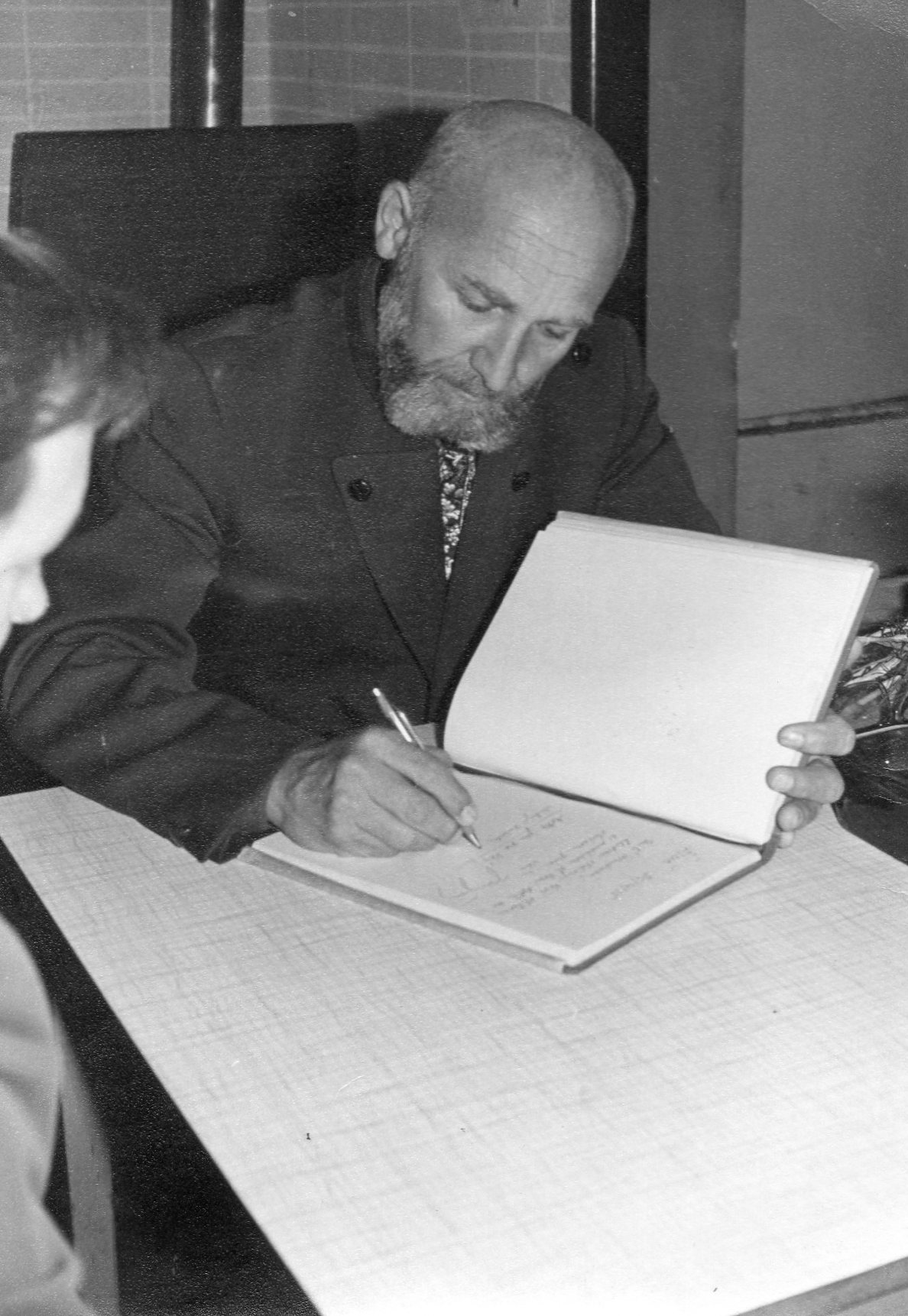
Josef Vágner, director of Dvůr Králové Zoo

Josef Vágner (May 26, 1928 – May 6, 2000) was a Czech zoologist, tropical forester, author, and the director of the Dvůr Králové Zoo in Dvůr Králové nad Labem.

== Early life and education ==
Vágner was born on May 26, 1928, in Ždírnice in Trutnov, Czechoslovakia (now Czech Republic). Having completed his secondary education at a technical school in Dvůr Králové nad Labem, Vágner attended a forestry college in Trutnov and graduated from the University of Agriculture and Forestry in Prague. In 1965 he completed an extramural postgraduate programme in tropical forestry and in 1974 became a candidate of agricultural and forestry sciences.

From 1952 to 1958, Vágner served as chief officer at the Military Forests Administration in Mirošov. From 1958 to 1964 he worked as a teacher at a forestry college in Svoboda nad Úpou.

== Director of Dvůr Králové Zoo ==
In 1965 Vágner took over as the director of the zoo in Dvůr Králové nad Labem, then known as the East Bohemian Zoological Garden (Czech: Východočeská zoologická zahrada). The zoo had been established in 1946 on an area of 6.5 hectares to house a small collection of local fauna. After the first twenty years of its existence, the area had quadrupled and the animal collections had expanded. Nonetheless, before Vágner joined the zoo in 1965, the institution's significance for environmental education and conservation was limited to the region.

The transformation of the zoo initiated by Vágner influenced animal husbandry standards and zoo culture throughout Czechoslovakia and internationally. An enthusiast of Africa, Vágner developed the previously unknown zoo into Europe's largest collection of African ungulates. His ten expeditions resulted in more than 3,000 animals being imported to Czechoslovakia, mostly from the great plains of East Africa.

Despite logistical challenges and strenuous days of sea travel, the shipments of African animals had a high survival rate. While some of the imported animals travelled further to other zoos across Europe, most remained in Dvůr Králové, forming some of the largest breeding herds of antelopes, zebras, giraffes, buffalos and rhinos outside of Africa. The rhinos eventually became the zoo's flagship species, and included the Northern White Rhinoceros, a subspecies of the White Rhino which, unlike the now abundant Southern White Rhinoceros, has been exterminated in the wild.

=== The safari ===
Vágner's idea of exhibiting large herds of African ungulates at the zoo was based on the concept of panoramic enclosures, developed by Karl Hagenbeck in Hamburg. A part of the zoo's area was landscaped panoramically, with dry moats and paths between individual grassed exhibits not visible to the spectator. Visitors thus have the illusion of animals of many different species inhabiting one common exhibit. The main part of Vágner's concept was the "Safari", a 30-hectare area with visitors driving in their cars among free-roaming animals. This stage of the zoo's development was completed six years after Vágner retired in 1983. Specially adapted buses were introduced instead of private cars.

=== Privatisation controversy ===
Vágner was criticised for his attempt to privatise the zoo through a company he had established with other family members. He submitted the privatisation plan in the mid-1990s, when financial problems threatened the viability of the zoo. As a result of a 1990 structural reform in Czechoslovakia, the zoo was allocated to a sub-regional budget, to which it presented a significant burden. Vágner claimed his privatisation offer was a solution to the problem. However, his offer was not accepted, and was strongly opposed by the management of the zoo.

== International work ==
Throughout his life, Josef Vágner worked in many countries in Africa and Asia, including Cameroon, Egypt, Kenya, Mozambique, Namibia, South Africa, Sudan, Tanganyika, Uganda, Zambia, India, Sri Lanka and Vietnam. Apart from transforming Dvůr Králové Zoo into a world-class breeding and research facility, Vágner participated in many other ventures. He was involved in the development of Košice Zoo in Slovakia, prepared a settlement plan of the left bank of Tana River for the Kenyan government, and created an Indian Rhino conservation scheme for India's Assam region.

== Honours ==
Vágner was awarded professional and scientific achievement prizes by the Czechoslovak Academy of Sciences (G. J. Mendel Silver Plaque), University of Life Sciences in Prague and the Veterinary University in Brno. He was a life member of the East African Wild Life Society. In 1999, Vágner was awarded honorary citizenship of Dvůr Králové nad Labem. At Plzeň Zoo, an exhibit presenting African nocturnal animals was dedicated to him. On 28 October 2025, Vágner was awarded the Medal of Merit.

== Publications ==
Vágner was also an author, whose works have been translated into seven languages, and also published internationally. Vágner was the author and co-author of nearly fifty research papers, as well as a similar number of popular articles, and appeared often on TV and radio. Outside Czechoslovakia Vágner gave public speeches and lectures in Austria, Belgium, Denmark, France, Germany, Hungary, Italy, the Netherlands, Poland, Russia (USSR), Sweden and the United Kingdom.

== Personal life ==
Vágner died in Dvůr Králové nad Labem on May 6, 2000. He and his wife Zdena had three sons and two daughters.

Vágner spoke Czech, Russian, German, English, French and Swahili.

=== Politics ===
Vágner was a member of the Communist Party from 1949 to 1970, when his membership was annulled, due to his opposition to the Warsaw Pact invasion of Czechoslovakia in 1968. In 1989-1990 he was one of the spokespersons of the Civic Forum, the opposition movement set up during the Velvet Revolution. He later joined the Civic Democratic Party.

== Bibliography ==
- Žirafy pro Československo (1970)
- Sen safari (1971)
  - (with his wife Zdena Vágnerová)
- Simba a ti druzí (1973)
- Safari pod Kilimandžárem (1975)
  - (with Naďa Schneiderová)
  - (translated into Russian by S.V. Davydjuk and published in Russia - USSR as Safari pod Kilimandžaro in 1979 and 1984)
  - (translated into Slovak by J. Blicha and published in Slovakia as Safari pod Kilimandžárom in 1985)
  - (translated into Hungarian by J. Magyar and published in Hungary as Szafari a Kilimandzsáró alatt in 1988)
- Mzuri Africa (1975)
- Afrika: raj a peklo zvířat: (od Atlasu na jih) (1978)
  - (published again in 1979 and 1990)
  - (translated into Russian by I. Macuľskoj and published in Russia - USSR as Afrika, raj i ad dlja zhivotnych in 1987)
  - (translated into German by L. Teltscherová and published in Germany as Afrika: Paradies und Hölle der Tiere in 1989)
  - (translated into French by D. Doppia and published in France as Afrique: Paradis et enfer des animaux in 1989)
- Afrika: život a smrt zvířat: vyprávění o afrických zvířatech, přírodě a lidech od Dračích hor na sever (1979)
  - (published again in 1987)
- Lev není králem zvířat (1981)
  - (with Naďa Schneiderová)
  - (published originally in Slovak as Lev nie je kráľom zvierat in 1981 and again in 1986 and 1988)
  - (1st Czech edition in 1990)
  - (translated into Russian by V. Rjabtschenko and E. Rulina and published in Russia - USSR as Car' zverej ne lev in 1984, 1987 and 1989)
  - (translated into Hungarian by J. Mayer and published in Hungary as Az oroszlán nem az állatok királya in 1984)
  - (translated into Polish by E. M. Hunca and published in Poland as Lew nie jest królem zwierząt in 1986 and 1989)
- Afrika (1987)
- Animals of Africa (1989)
  - (first published in the UK)
- Zvířata v Africe (1992)
  - (translated into Polish by M. Garbarczyk and H. Garbarczyk and published in Poland as Afrykańskie zwierzęta in 1992)
  - (translated into Slovak by H. Suchá and published in Slovakia as Zvierata v Afrike in 1992)
- Zvířata Afriky (1995)
  - (translated into Slovak by A. Hronková and published in Slovakia as Zvierata Afriky in 1995)
- Rádžové indických džunglí (1995)
  - (with Naďa Schneiderová)
- Kimuri: lovecké příběhy a pohádky z Afriky (1997)
  - (with Zdeněk Vágner)
