= Addis Ababa Zoo =

Zoological park in Addis Ababa, Ethiopia

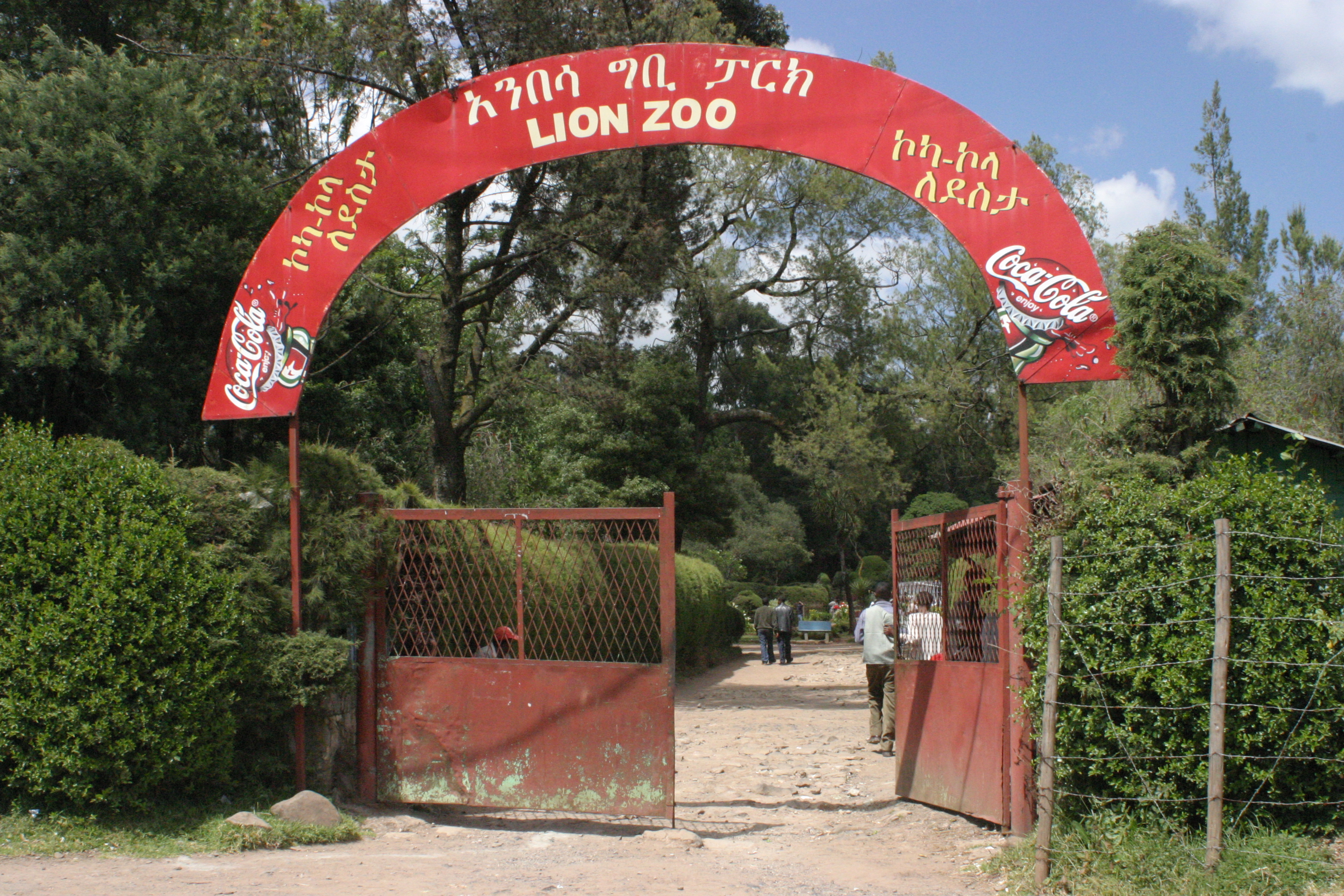
- Gate of Addis Abeba Lion Zoo
- Interactive map of Addis Ababa Zoo
- 9°02′34.8″N 38°45′43.2″E
- Date opened: 1948; 78 years ago
- Location: Addis Ababa, Ethiopia

Addis Ababa Zoo (Amharic: አንበሳ ጊቢ, romanized: änəbäsa gibi lit. 'lion compound') is a zoological park in Addis Ababa, Ethiopia.

== History ==
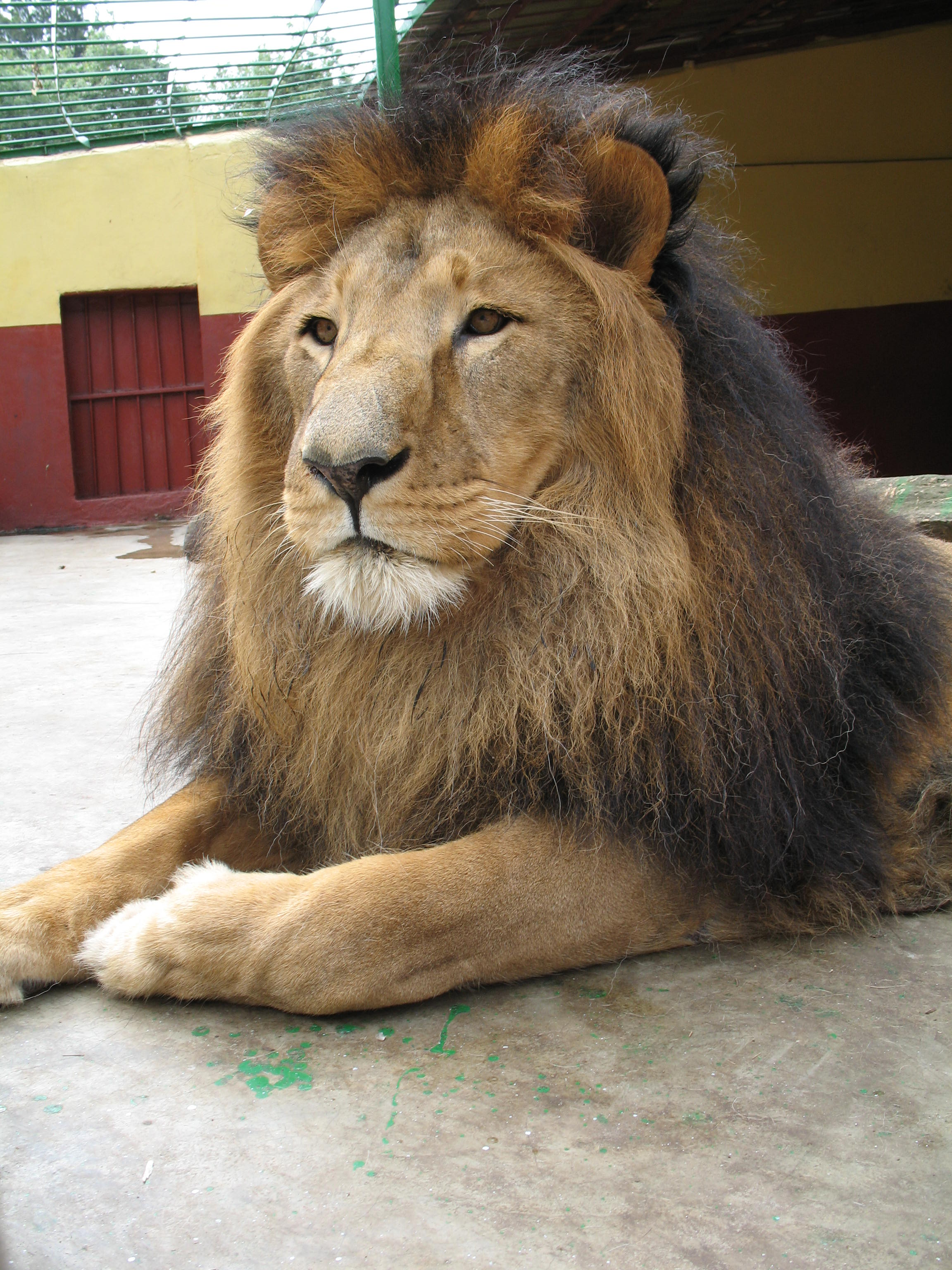
Male lion at the zoo

The zoo was founded in 1948 by Emperor Haile Selassie I.

== Fauna ==
The Addis Ababa Zoo keeps apes, lesser kudus, ducks, eagles and tortoises.

Several lions kept in the zoo were found to be genetically similar to wild Central African lions from Cameroon and Chad, but different to captive lions are Sana'a Zoo in Yemen, which were thought to be of Ethiopian origin, and wild lion samples from Ngorongoro and Serengeti National Parks in East Africa, and those of southwestern Africa and India. Their extensive dark manes are similar to those of the Barbary and Cape lions.

== See also ==
- Drakenstein Lion Park
- Rabat Zoo
- Khartoum Zoo
