= Rabat Zoo =

Zoological park in Rabat

- حَدِيْقَة ٱلْحَيْوَانَات بِٱلرِّبَاط (in Arabic); Arabic: ٱلْحَدِيْقَة ٱلْوَطَنِيَّة لِلْحَيْوَانَات بِٱلرِّبَاط (in Arabic); Jardine Zoologique de Rabat (in French)

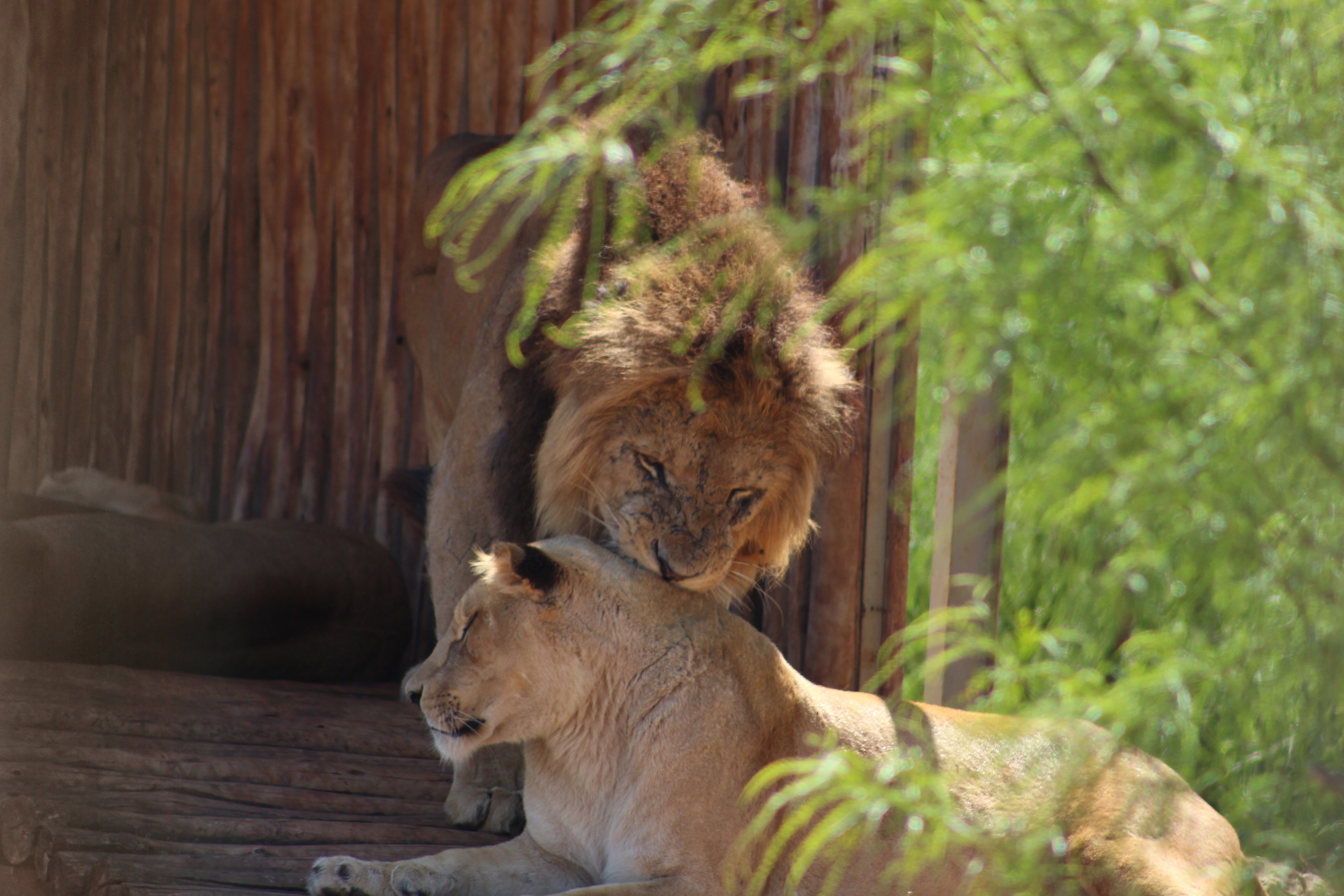
- A couple of lions at the zoo
- Interactive map of Rabat Zoo
- 33.953°N 6.895°W
- Date opened: 1973 (as Temara Zoo); reopened in 2012
- Location: Rabat, Morocco
- Land area: 119 acres (48 ha)
- No. of animals: 2000
- No. of species: 190
- Annual visitors: 6 million
- Website: rabatzoo.ma (in French)

Rabat Zoo (Arabic: حَدِيْقَة ٱلْحَيْوَانَات بِٱلرِّبَاط, romanized: Ḥadīqat al-Ḥaywānāt bir-Ribāṭ ("Zoological Garden in Rabat"), ٱلْحَدِيْقَة ٱلْوَطَنِيَّة لِلْحَيْوَانَات بِٱلرِّبَاط ("The National Park for Animals in Rabat"); French: Jardin Zoologique de Rabat), formerly known as "Temara Zoo", is a zoological park near Rabat in Morocco that was established in 1973. The first enclosures were built to house lions that were previously kept in the royal palace. These lions, believed to be descendants of the now-extinct Barbary lion, form the ancestral line of the zoo’s current lion population.

== Conservation ==
The zoo works to establish viable populations of endangered animals in the long term, allowing for the strengthening of the animal collection and, consequently, the reintroduction of certain groups into their original natural habitats. It reportedly houses over 1,800 animals representing nearly 180 species and works on more than 22 conservation programs for rare and endangered endemic species. Eight of these species are the subject of a reintroduction program to reintegrate them into their natural habitat, including five species extinct in the wild in Morocco.

In the first quarter of 2024, more than 70 animals of Moroccan and African endemic species were reportedly born at the zoo. In a statement, the zoo indicated that "these species are classified by the International Union for Conservation of Nature (IUCN) as endangered, critically endangered as is the case for the addax, or endangered for the bald ibis, or vulnerable such as the Barbary sheep and Dorcas gazelles."

=== Lions ===
Given that the Barbary lion is extinct in the wilderness, importance has been given to finding possible Barbary lions or descendants of the Barbary lion in captivity. So far, tests indicate the lions of the zoo are not pure Barbary lions, but descendants of the original Barbary lion. This is partly as members of the Moroccan royal family had kept lions that were captured from the Atlas Mountains.

As of November 2024, the zoo maintained a group of 33 Barbary lions, comprising 17 males and 16 females ranging in age from 26 years to a few months, and has recorded approximately 18 births since its opening in 2012.

== Gallery ==
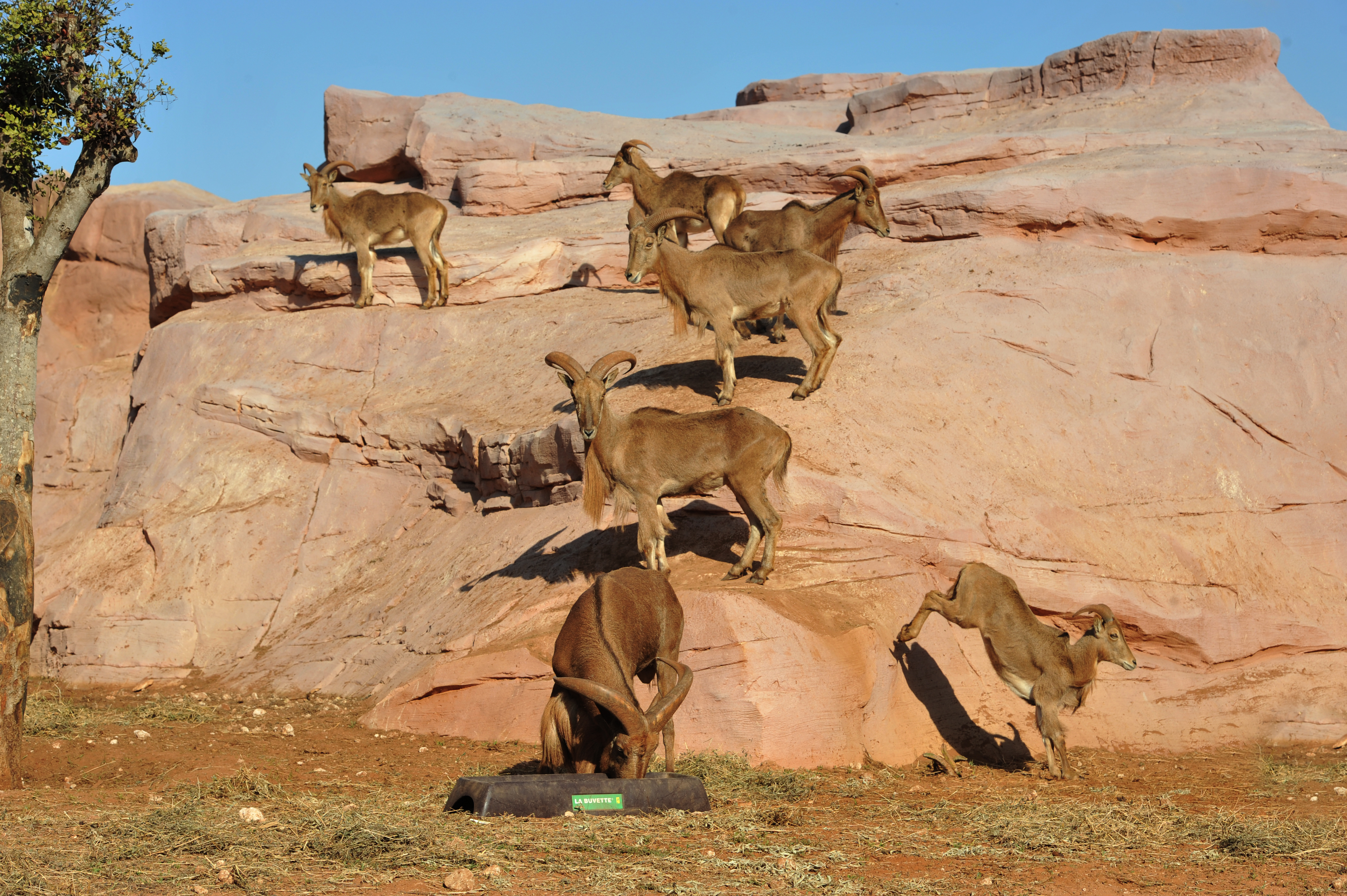
Barbary sheep

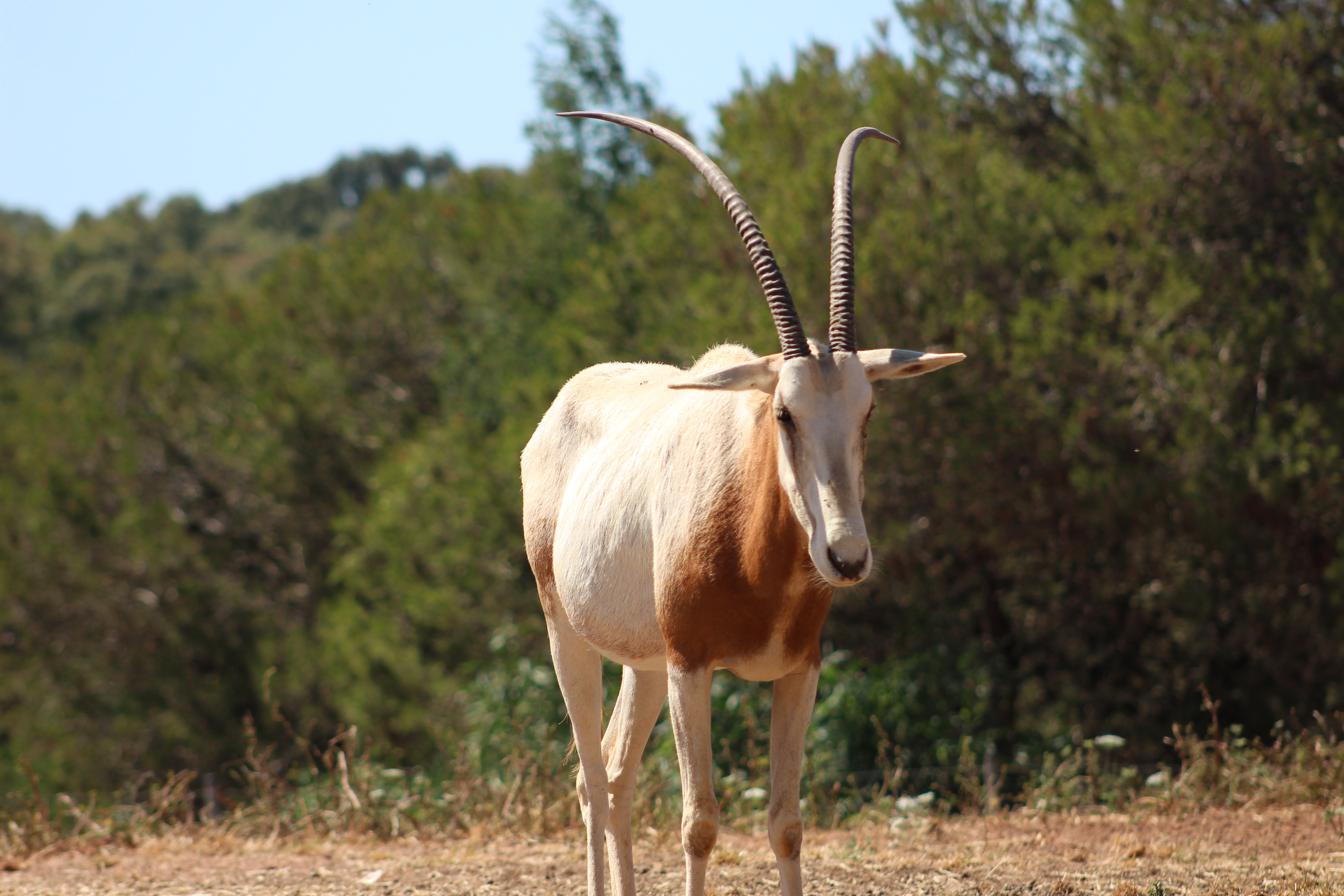
Scimitar oryx

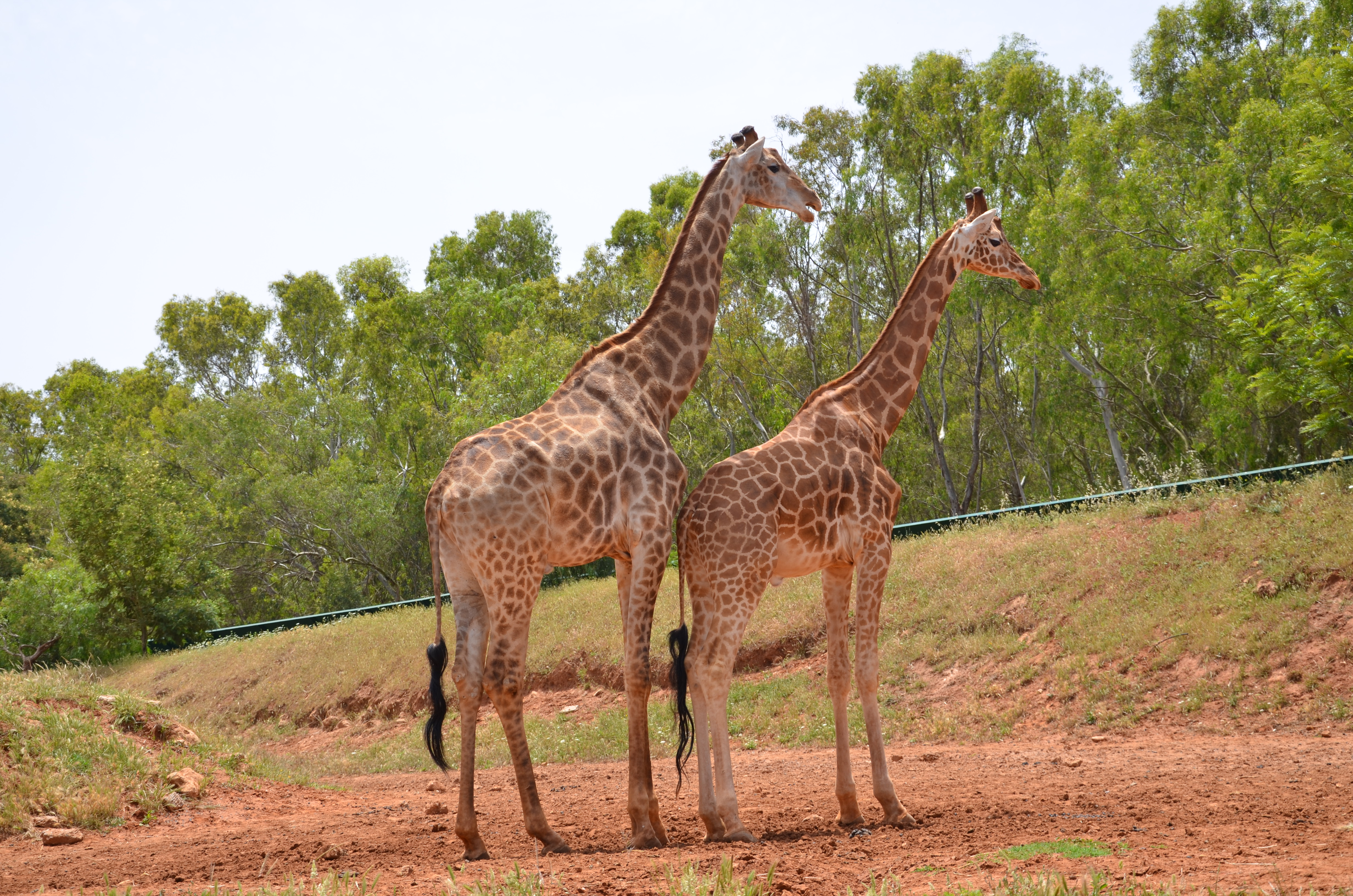
Giraffes

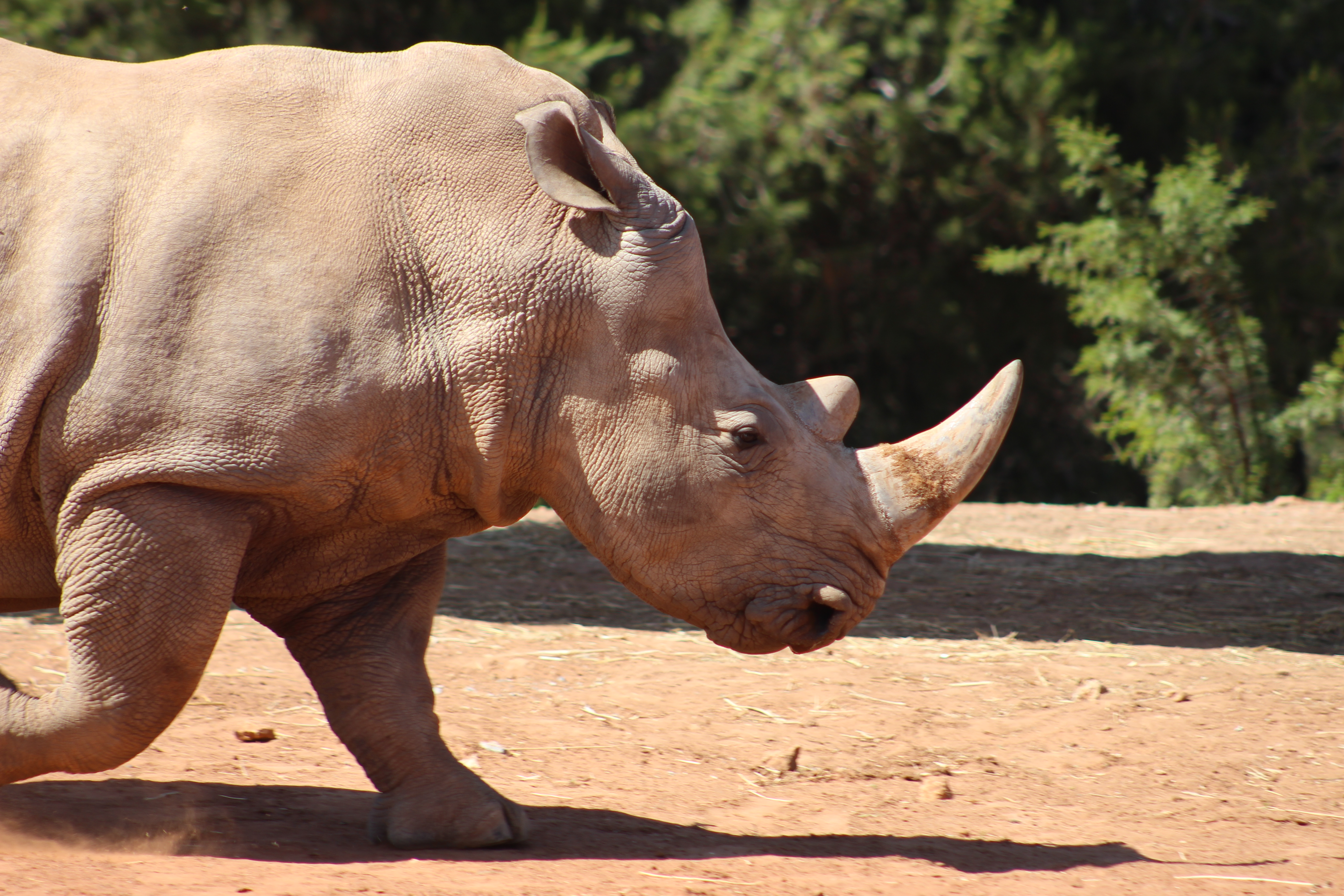
White rhinoceros

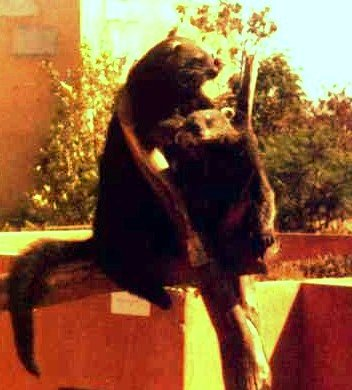
Binturongs

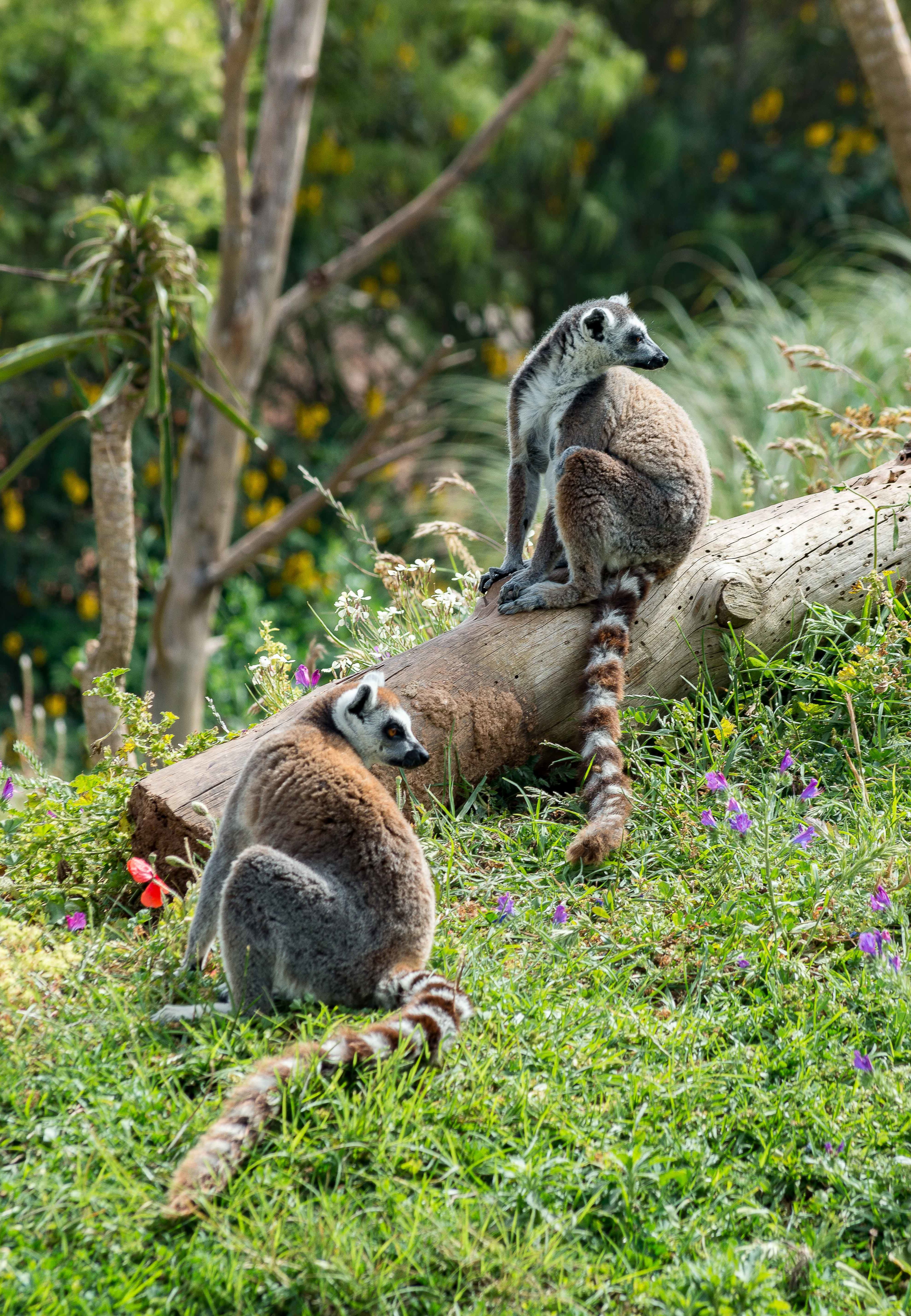
Ring-tailed lemurs

Baboons

Chimpanzee

Gorilla

Crocodile

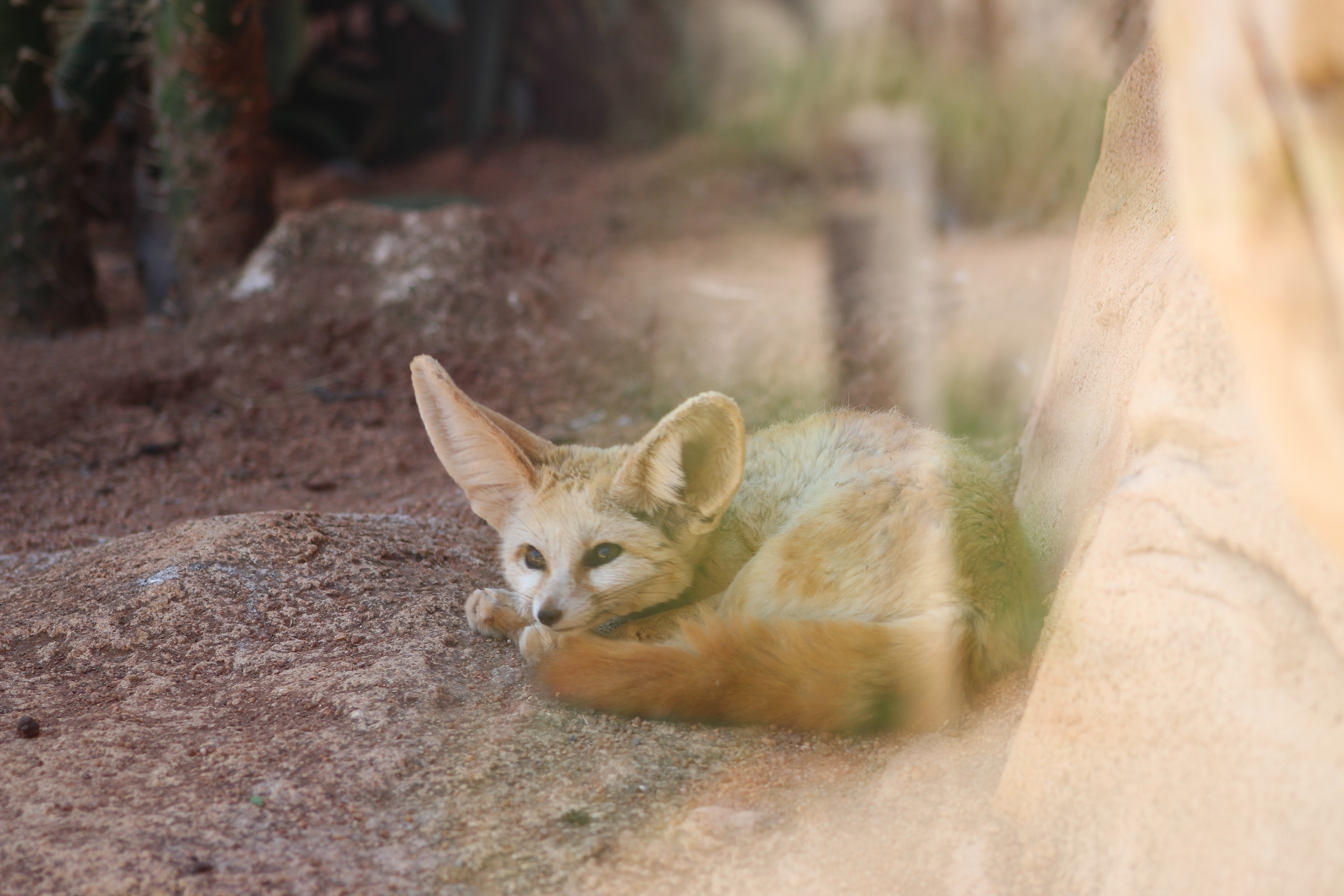
Fennec Fox

Flamingos

== See also ==
- Addis Ababa Zoo
- Drakenstein Lion Park
- Parc Sindibad, Casablanca
