= Khartoum Zoo =

Zoological Park at Khartoum, Sudan

- Arabic: حديقة حيوانات الخرطوم, romanized: Ḥadīqat al-Ḥaywānāt bir-Khārtoum
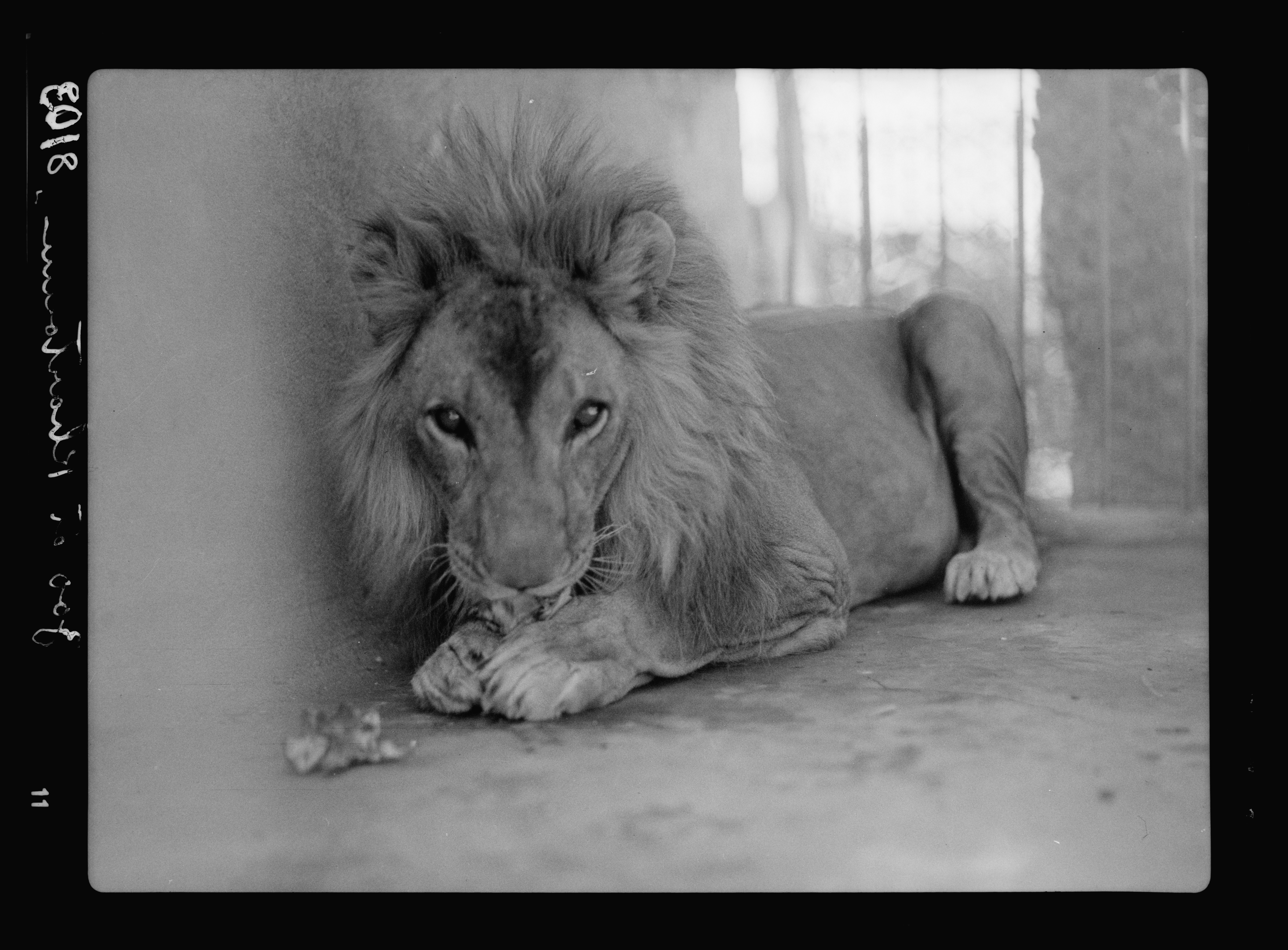
- Male lion at the zoo, 1936
- Date opened: 1901
- Location: Khartoum, Sudan

The Khartoum Zoo (Arabic: حديقة حيوانات الخرطوم, romanized: Ḥadīqat al-Ḥaywānāt bir-Khārtoum) was a zoological park located in Khartoum, Sudan.

== History ==
The zoo was founded at the center of Khartoum in 1901 to house animals given to "the Governor General as complimentary presents" and those caught for sale to zoos in Europe and other places. In 1903 it was moved to a spot between the White and Blue Niles. In 1995, the zoo was moved again after the grounds were sold to an investor. After the closure of the zoological gardens, the Corinthia Hotel was built on the site.

The Kuku Zoo (Arabic: حديقة كوكو العالمية) was established in Hilat Koko, in Khartoum, in 2009 by the Faculty of Veterinary Medicine and Animal Production of the Sudan University of Science and Technology.

== Animals ==
The old Khartoum Zoological Gardens kept animals such as lions, elephants, zebras, hippopotamus, tortoises, rhinoceroses, and others.

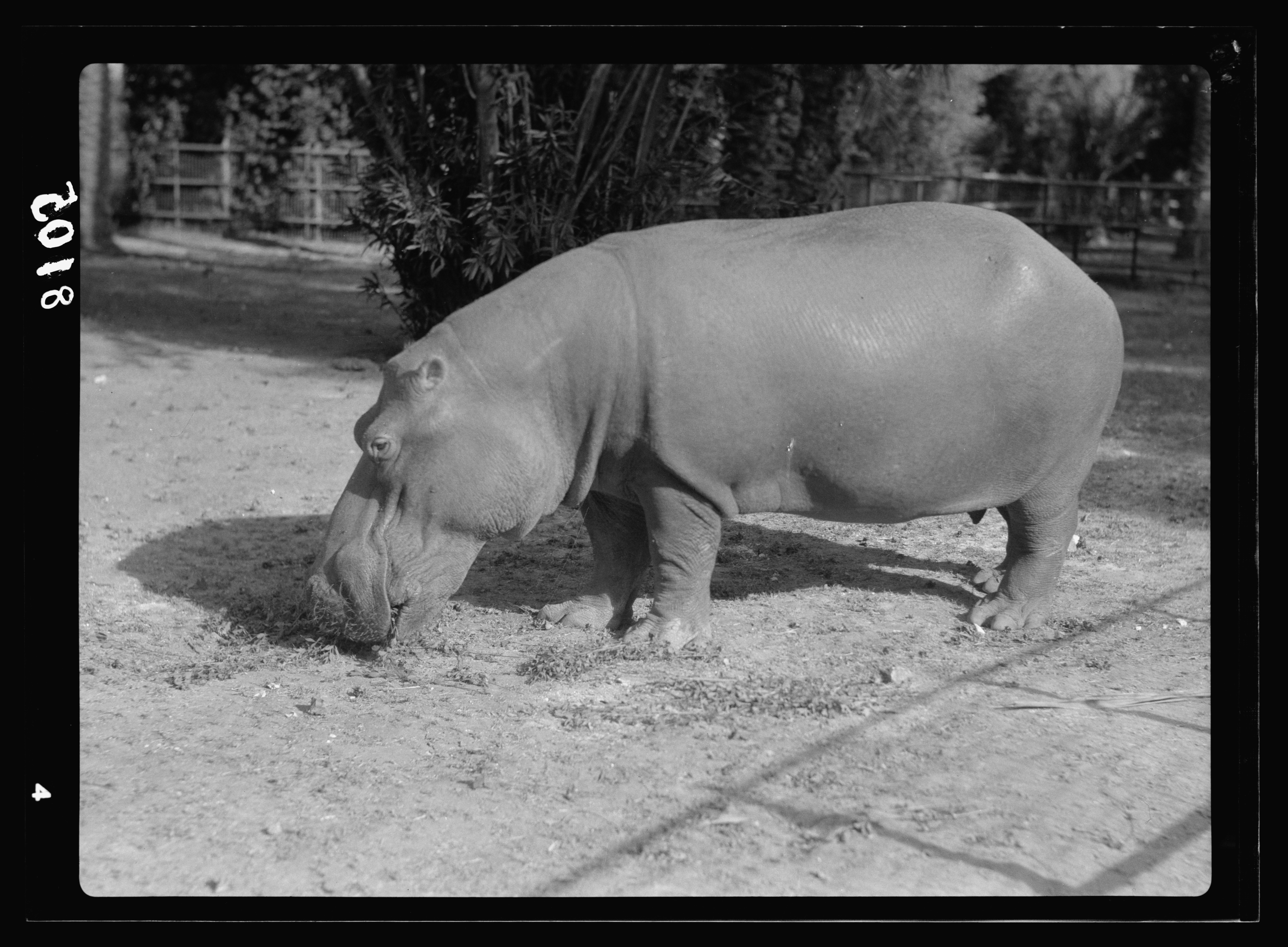
Hippopotamus

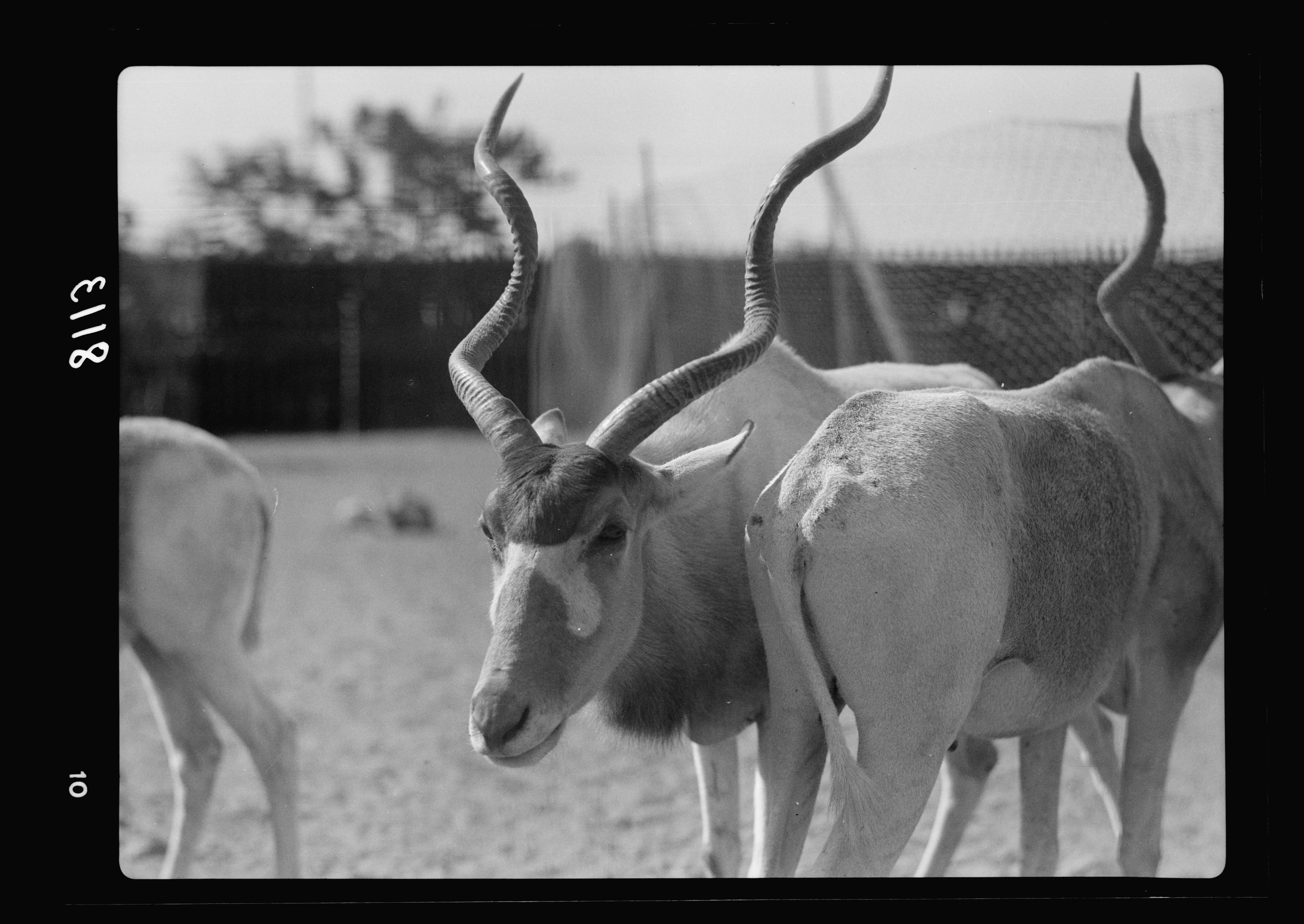
Antelope

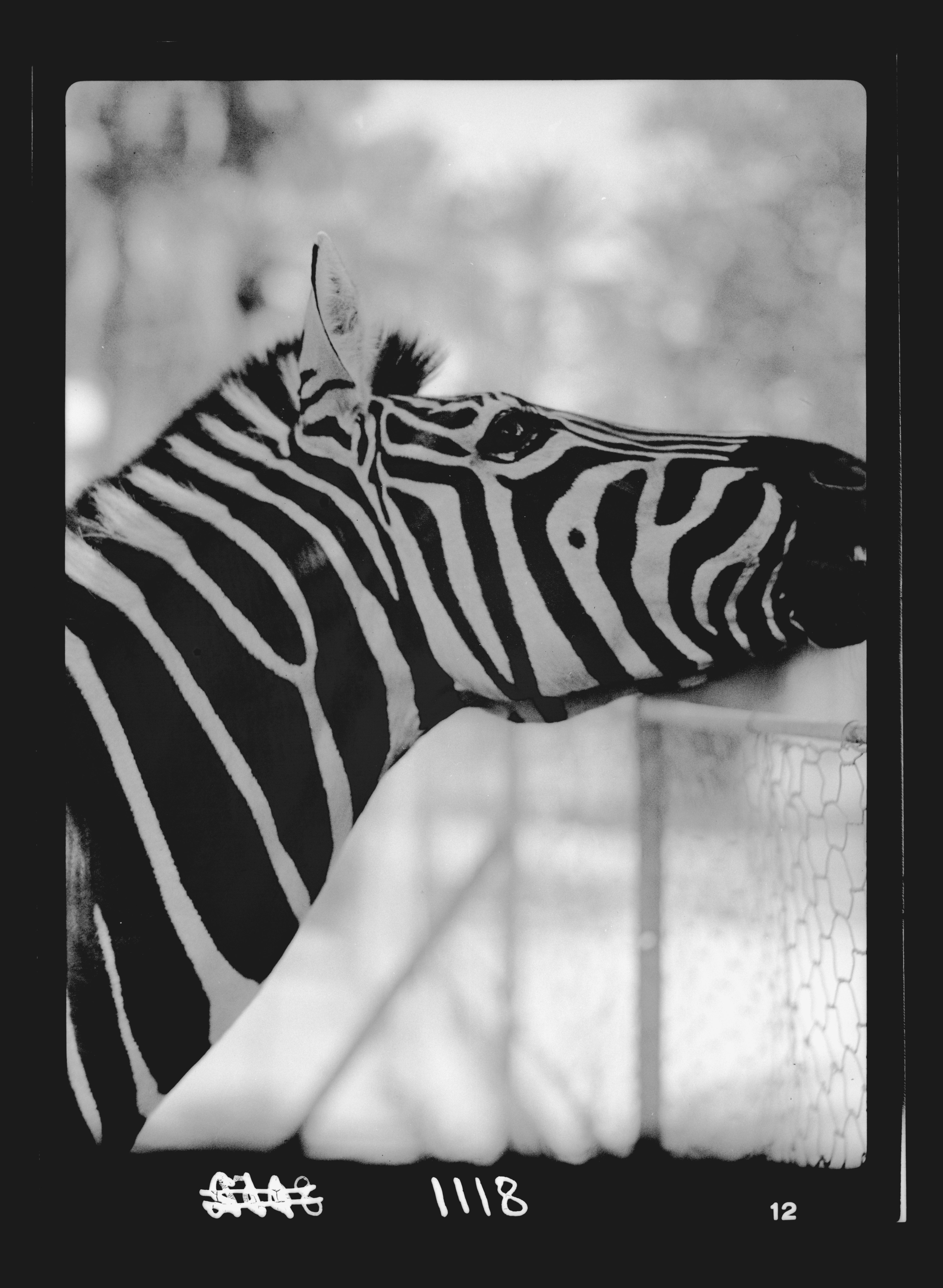
Zebra

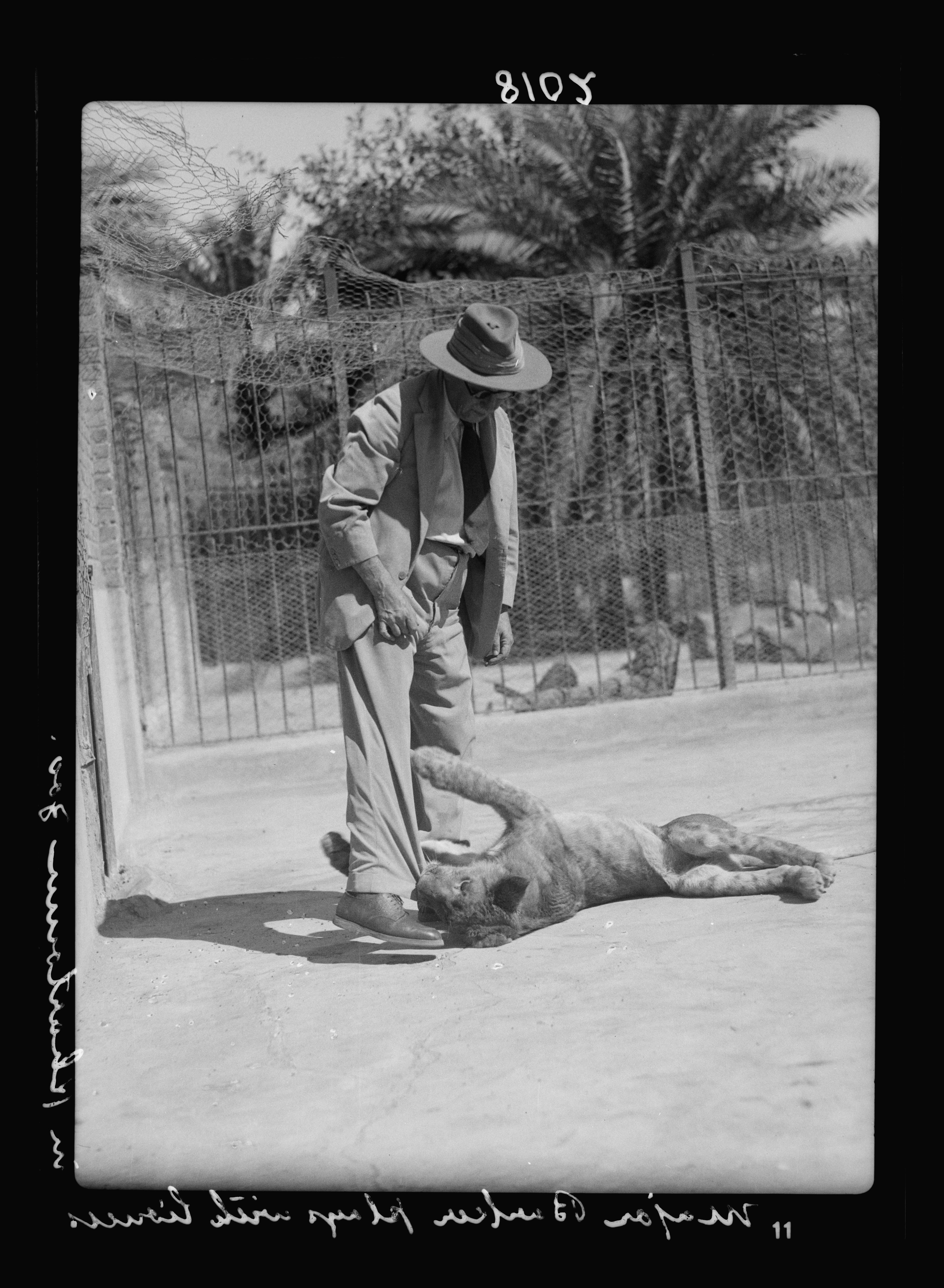
Director of the Zoo, Major Barker, playing with a lioness, 1936.

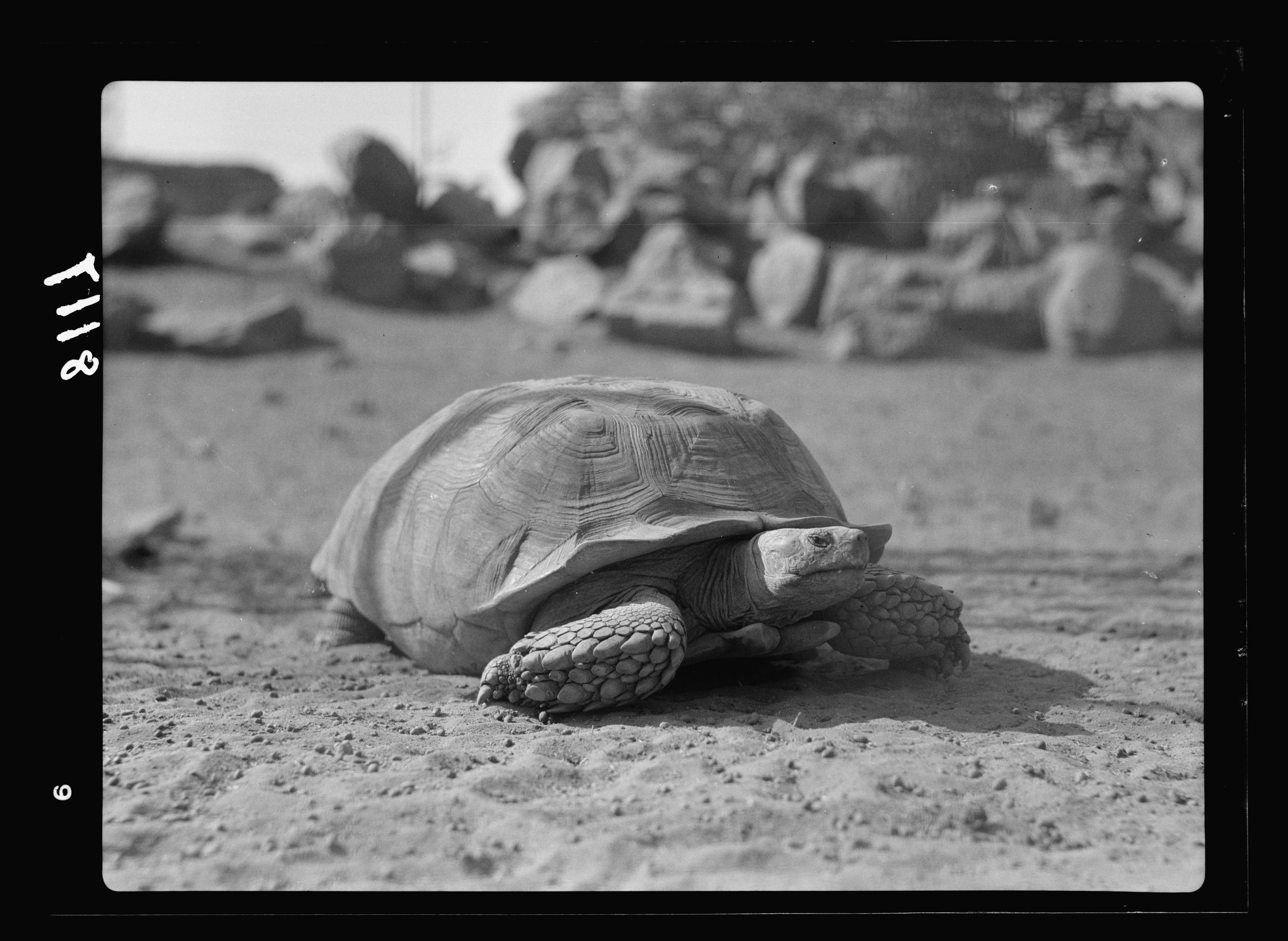
Tortoise

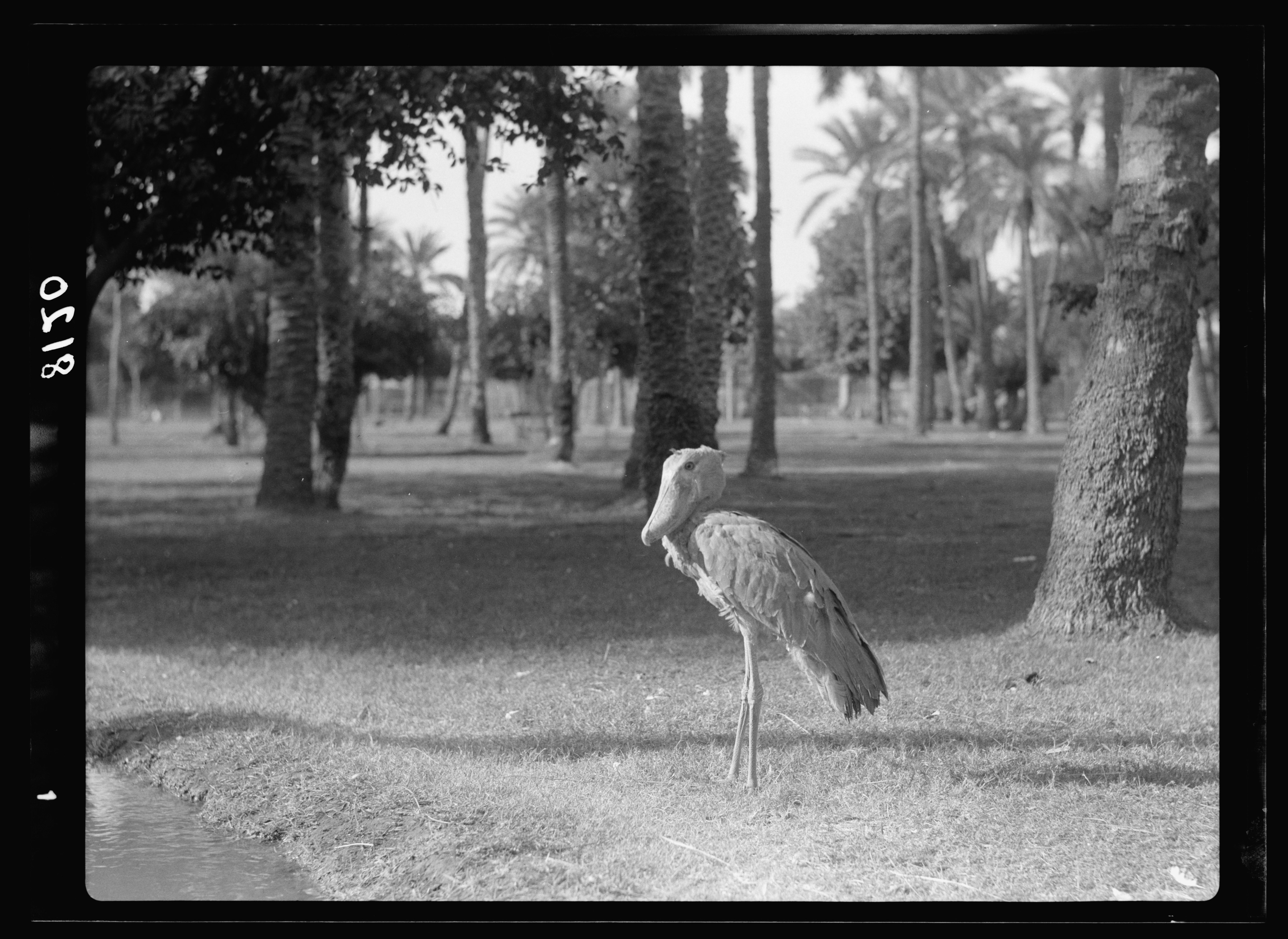
Shoebill

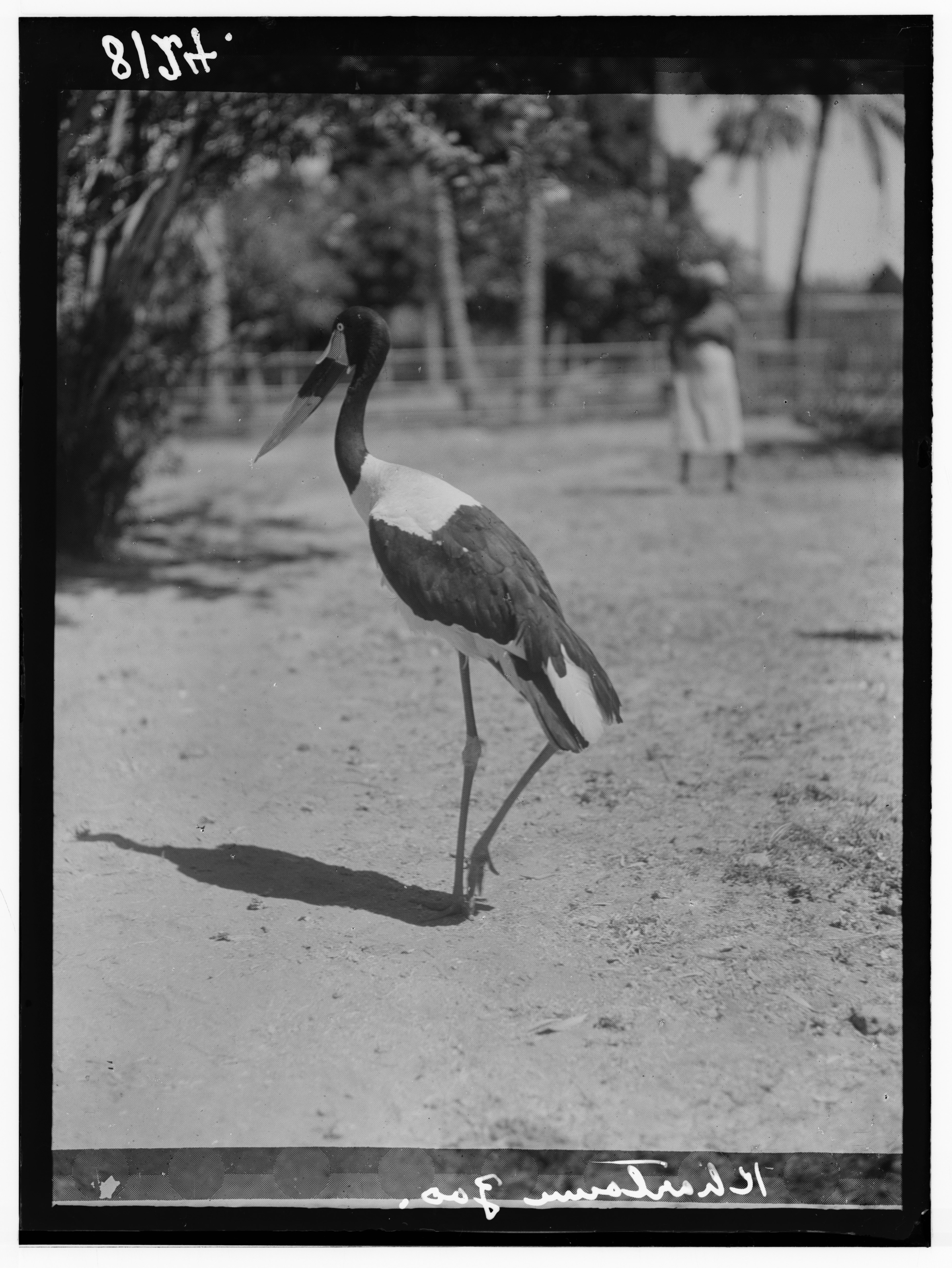
Saddle-billed storks

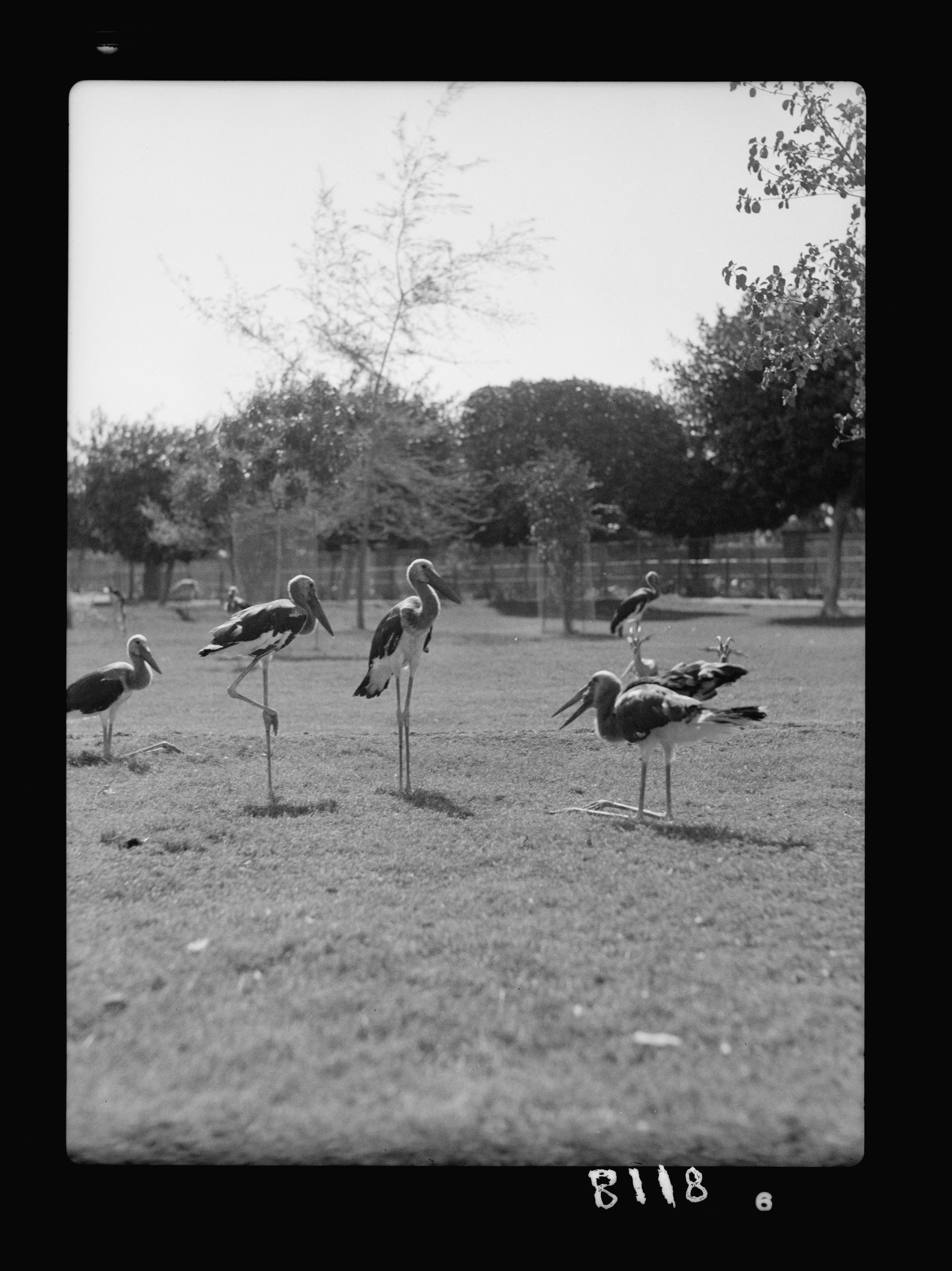
Water birds

== See also ==
- Addis Ababa Zoo
- Rabat Zoo
