= Safari Park Dvůr Králové =

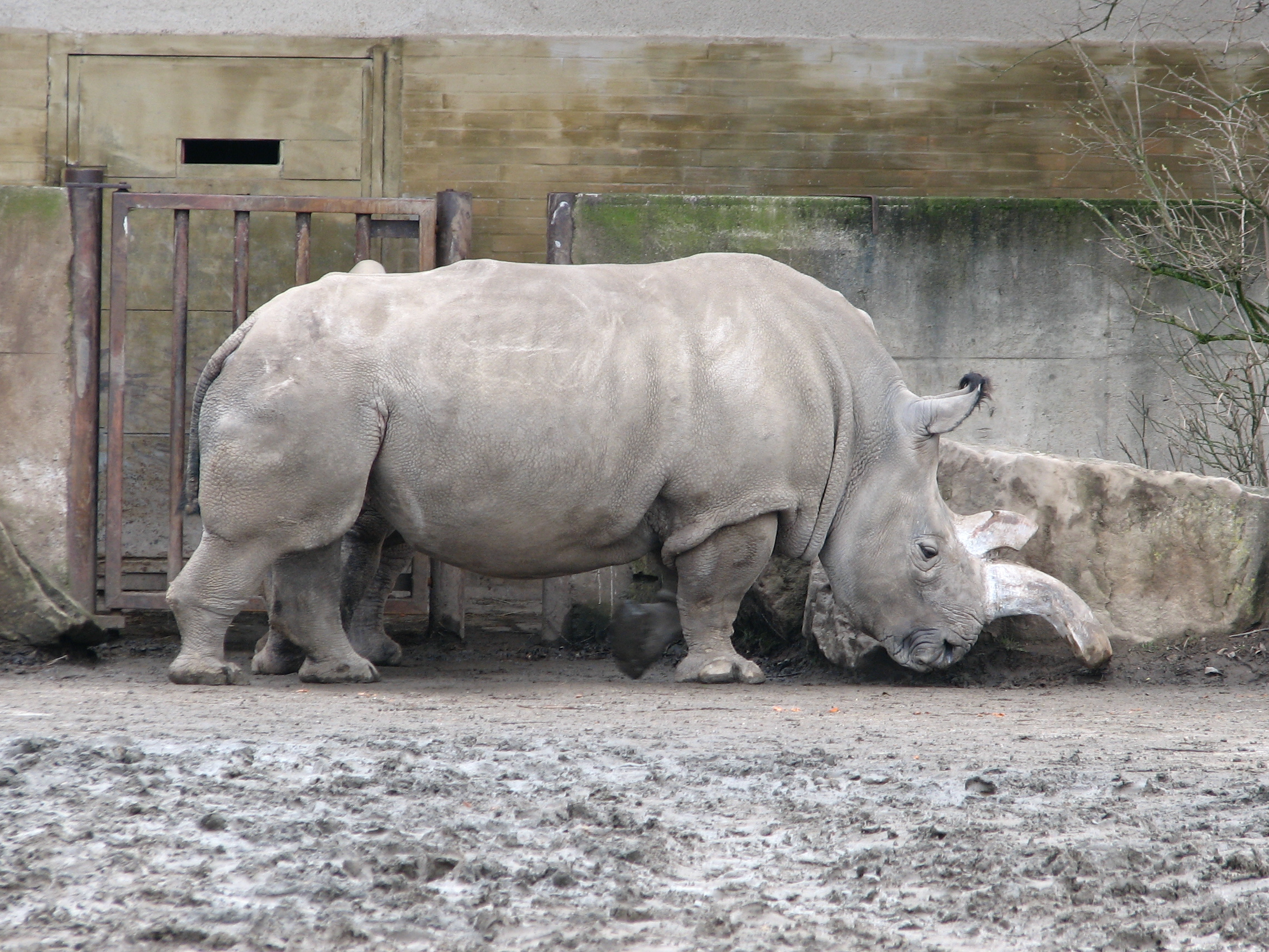
- A Northern White Rhino in Safari Park Dvůr Králové
- Interactive map of Safari Park Dvůr Králové
- 50°25′49″N 15°48′05″E
- Location: Dvůr Králové nad Labem, Czech Republic
- Land area: 72 ha (180 acres)
- No. of animals: 2,300
- Major exhibits: African Savanna
- Website: safaripark.cz/en/

Safari Park Dvůr Králové, known as Dvůr Králové Zoo until 2018, is a 72-hectare (180-acre) zoo located in Dvůr Králové nad Labem, Czech Republic. It is the second largest zoo in the country, showcasing a large open "safari" section. One of its most significant missions is to protect endangered and threatened wildlife species.

The zoo's specialization is African fauna, and has the largest group of African animals in Europe. The zoo is also one of the most important breeders of African ungulates in the world.

Their rarest animals are northern white rhinoceros, which are now on loan (Last Chance to Survive Program) to Ol Pejeta Conservancy in Kenya. The zoo is the only one in the world where northern white rhinos have successfully given birth, with the last calf being born in 2000.

== History of the zoo ==
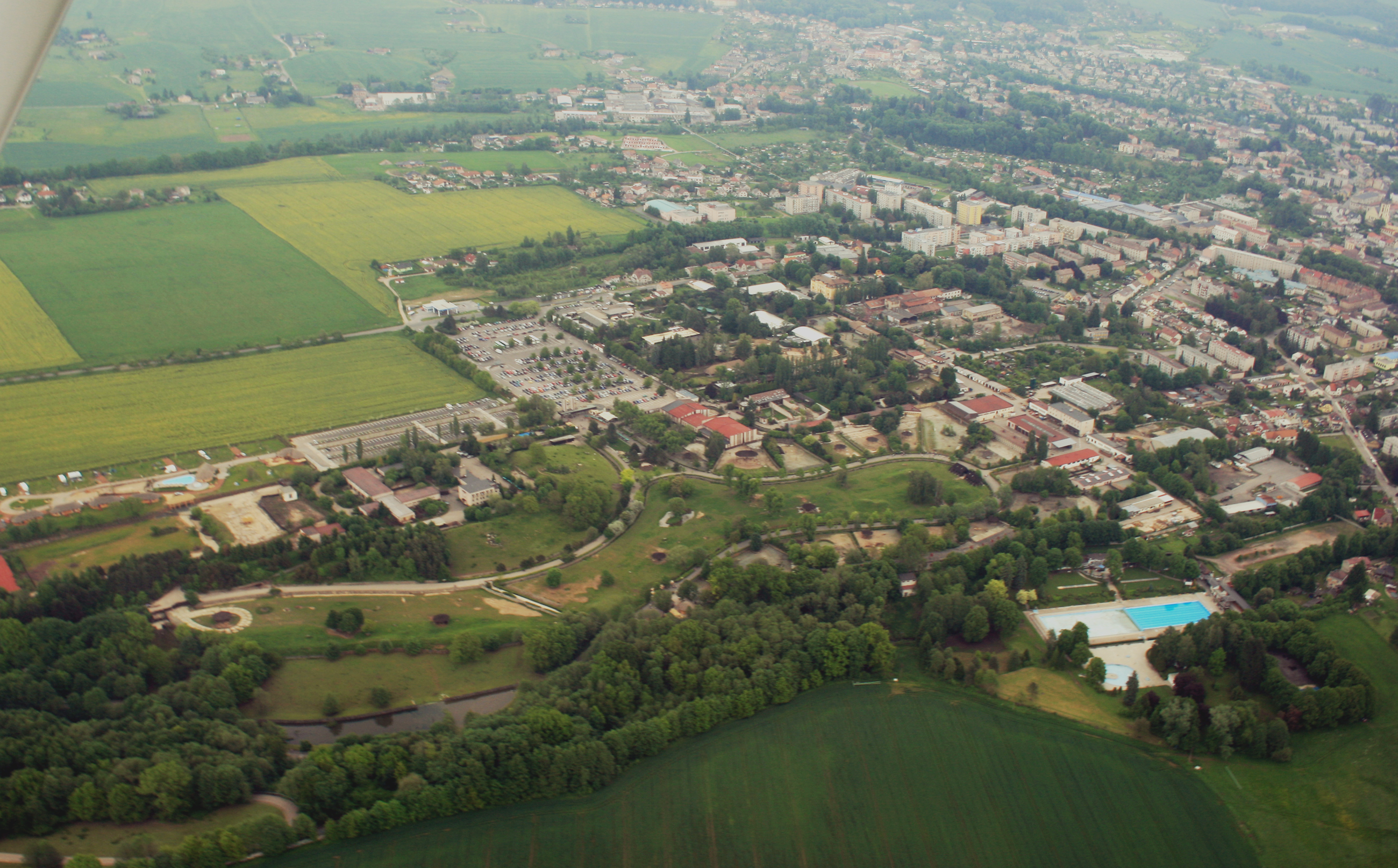
Aerial view of Safari Park Dvůr Králové

The zoo was established in 1946 on an area of 6.5 hectares to house a small collection of local fauna and was originally known as the East Bohemian Zoological Garden (Czech: Východočeská zoologická zahrada).

After the first twenty years of its existence, the area had quadrupled and the animal collections had expanded. Nonetheless, before 1965 the institution's significance for environmental education and conservation was limited to the region.

=== From local to global importance ===
In 1965, Josef Vágner took over as the zoo's director. The transformation of the zoo initiated by Vágner influenced animal husbandry standards and zoo culture throughout Czechoslovakia and the world.

An enthusiast of Africa, Vágner developed the previously unknown zoo into Europe's largest collection of African ungulates.

=== Ten expeditions to Africa ===
Ten expeditions of Vágner resulted in more than 3,000 animals being imported to Czechoslovakia, mostly from the great plains of East Africa.

Despite logistical challenges and strenuous days of sea travel, the shipments of African animals had a high survival rate. While some of the imported animals travelled further to other zoos across Europe, most remained in Dvůr Králové, forming some of the largest breeding herds of antelopes, zebras, giraffes, buffalos and rhinos outside of Africa.

The rhinos eventually became the zoo's flagship species, and included the Northern White Rhinoceros, a subspecies of the White Rhino which, unlike the now abundant Southern White Rhinoceros, has been exterminated in the wild.

Among them, the most famous of the animals was Sudan, the last known male Northern White Rhinoceros in the world.

=== Safari ===
Vágner's idea of exhibiting large herds of African ungulates at the zoo was based on the concept of panoramic enclosures, developed by Karl Hagenbeck in Hamburg.

A part of the zoo's area was landscaped panoramically, with dry moats and paths between individual grassed exhibits not visible to the spectator. Visitors thus have the illusion of animals of many different species inhabiting one common exhibit. The main part of Vágner's concept was the "Safari," a 30-hectare area with visitors driving in their cars among free-roaming animals.

This stage of the zoo's development was completed six years after Vágner retired in 1983. Specially adapted buses were introduced instead of private cars.

== Membership ==
Safari Park Dvůr Králové is a member of the Czech and Slovak Union of Zoological Gardens (UCSZ), founded in 1990, with 15 Czech and 4 Slovak member zoos. From 1995 to 2010, Safari Park Dvůr Králové was a member of the European Association of Zoos and Aquaria (EAZA). From 1997 to 2012, Safari Park Dvůr Králové was a member of the World Association of Zoos and Aquariums (WAZA).
