= Ellen Trout Zoo =

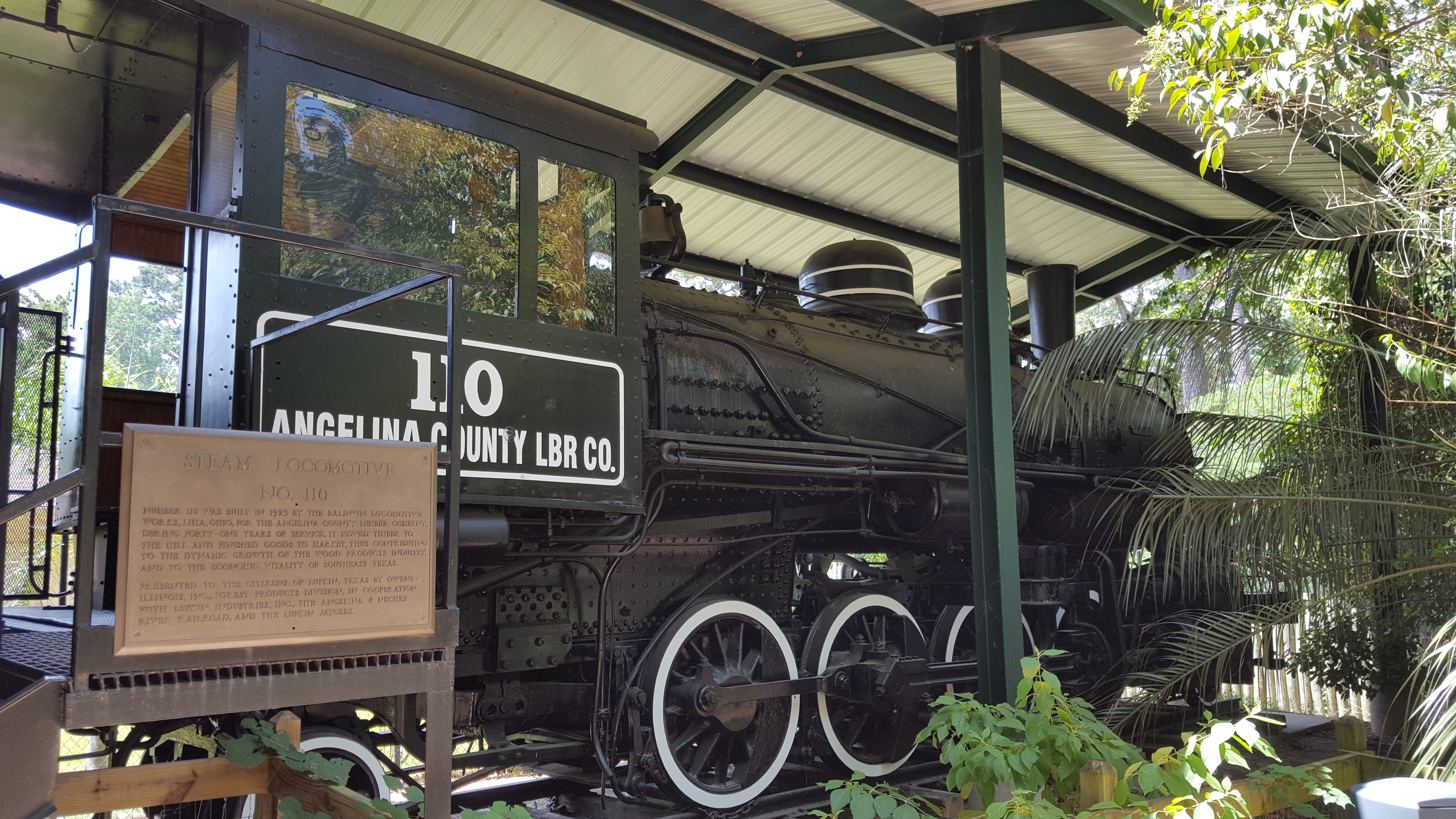
- The Angelina County Lumber Company Engine #110, on exhibit at the zoo.
- Interactive map of Ellen Trout Zoo
- 31.3752937°N 94.7271037°W
- Date opened: June 17, 1967
- Location: Lufkin, Texas
- Land area: 15 acres (6.1 ha)
- No. of animals: 700
- Annual visitors: 150,000
- Website: https://www.ellentroutzoo.com/

The Ellen Trout Zoo is a small zoo founded by Walter Trout in 1967 and located in Lufkin, Texas, United States. The zoo gets about 150,000 visitors a year. It is currently owned and operated by the City of Lufkin, with Friends of Ellen Trout Zoo (F.O.E.T.Z.) supporting it with funding for major expansion and renovation projects in the Zoo's master plan.

This zoo participates in several Species Survival Plans (SSP) including rhinos, Bali mynah, and cotton-top tamarin.

== History ==
In mid-December 1965, Trout received a 500-pound (230 kg) hippopotamus as a Christmas present. The hippo, named Hippie, was boarded at the Louisiana Purchase Gardens and Zoo in Monroe, Louisiana, until a hippo pen was completed eighteen months later. The present zoo was built around the hippo pen, and was officially opened on June 17, 1967. The zoo was named after Trout’s mother.

Since 1989, the Lufkin Kiwanis Club has helped with projects at the zoo. To date, thirteen projects have been completed, totaling over 3,200 person hours of donated time and $35,000 of donated materials.

In 1999, the Maasai giraffe and white rhinoceros exhibits opened. These were followed by a Nile hippopotamus exhibit in 2002 where visitors can view the animals both above and below the waterline. Hippie's old home is now the Koi pond exhibit.

In 2007, a hippo named Pancho died after swallowing a rubber ball. The ball caused a blockage in the intestine that ended up causing a loss of oxygen to the brain and heart. The rubber ball was most likely put in the containment by a zoo visitor.

Paddy the female southern white rhinoceros died at age twenty-eight on November 9, 2023. In April, the zoo lost its Association of Zoos & Aquariums accreditation. Bwana the male southern white rhinoceros permanently transferred to the San Diego Zoo Safari Park to generously join a larger crash during that same month. Chitabe the male southern white rhinoceros arrived from Lion Country Safari two years later. In September of 2026, the zoo regained its Association of Zoos and Aquariums accreditation.

== Animals ==
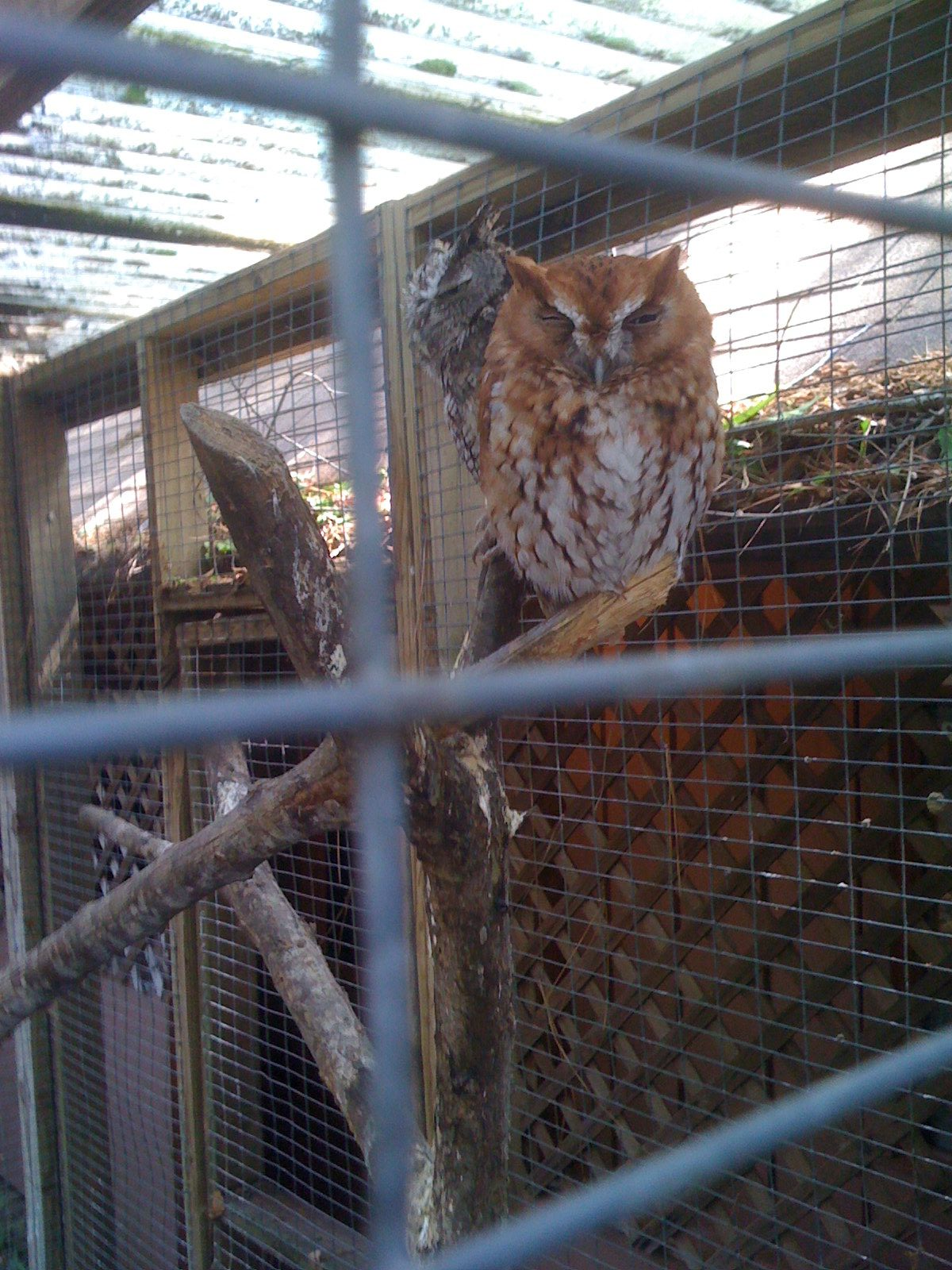
Screech owl at the Ellen Trout Zoo.

The zoo currently houses about 700 animals and helps conserve close to 50 different species of animals that are in a Species Survival Plan. Animals that visitors will see at the zoo include De Brazza's monkey, jaguar, Jamaican fruit bat, Galapagos tortoise, Fly River turtle, bontebok, emu, hippos, raccoons, Bennett's wallaby, sulcata tortoise, nene, bay duiker, Malayan tapir, spectacled owl, Chilean flamingo, toco toucan, white-faced saki, cotton-top tamarin, Komodo dragon, American alligator, Chinese alligator, Nile crocodile, Siamese crocodile, North American river otter, southern white rhinoceros, bobcat, clouded leopard, lion, Malayan tiger and Masai giraffe.

== Education ==
Ellen Trout Zoo started offering educational programs to schools in the area in 1977. Current offerings include "Wildlife on Wheels," a series of in-classroom programs for elementary students about endangered species, animal adaptations, animal taxonomy, and rainforest environments, various school programs at the zoo, teacher workshops, university internships, and curriculum supplements.

Summer programs include the Junior Zookeeper program for seventh, eighth, and ninth graders where children work directly with zookeepers, and the Zoo Safari program.
