= Savorgnan de Brazza =

Savorgnan de Brazza or Savorgnan di Brazza may refer to:

- Jacques Savorgnan de Brazza (1859–1888), also known as Jacques Savorgnan di Brazza and Giacomo Savorgnan de Brazza e Cergneu, Italian naturalist, mountaineer, and explorer
- Pierre Savorgnan de Brazza (1852–1905), also known as Pietro Paolo Savorgnan di Brazzà, Italian-born French explorer
- French aviso Savorgnan de Brazza, a French Navy warship completed in 1933 and sold in 1957
