= Penelope (platypus) =

Platypus at the Bronx Zoo

- Species: Platypus
- Sex: Female
- Hatched: Burleigh Heads, Gold Coast, Australia
- Died: Disappeared July 1957; New York City
- Owners: David Fleay, Bronx Zoo
- Residence: Bronx Zoo

Penelope (disappeared July 1957) was a platypus at the Bronx Zoo known for faking a pregnancy and escaping from the zoo's platypusary after rejecting repeated attempts at courtship from her male counterpart, Cecil. Penelope repeatedly made headlines for her disinterest in Cecil and for faking a pregnancy, garnering titles such as "brazen hussy" and "one of those saucy females who like to keep a male on a string".

== Arrival at the Bronx Zoo ==
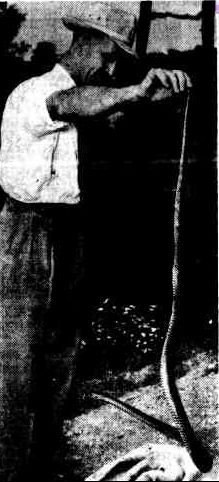
David Fleay, the Australian biologist who was the first person to breed platypuses in captivity.

On April 25, 1947, Burleigh zoologists David and Sigrid Fleay travelled by sea to bring three platypuses to the Bronx Zoo, where they became the only platypuses living in captivity outside of Australia at the time. The platypuses were named Penelope, Cecil, and Betty. (Penelope was named after Penelope from Homer's Odyssey.) The zoo built a 21-by-8-foot (6.4 by 2.4 m) platypusary for them to live in, where each animal had its own swimming pool and private burrows. However, Betty died of a cold after arriving to the United States, so just Penelope and Cecil, who weighed two and four pounds respectively, lived in the enclosure.

The platypusary opened to the public on April 29, 1957. Cecil and Penelope slept during the days except for their hour-long break to see visitors. At night, they came out to eat dinner of "25 to 35 live crayfish, 200 to 300 worms, one frog, several scrambled eggs," and mud.

Cecil and Penelope were temperamental and seemingly worked to change their new environment to their likings. Cecil "quietly went about dying" until his tank color was changed, Penelope refused food until her tank's awning was replaced, and Cecil's heart pumped dangerously until a zookeeper's uniform was changed from white to a dull green. Zoo officials continually responded to the platypuses' emotional confrontational reactions, changing the platypusary design several times, adjusting the volume of the public address system, and denying entry to women in bright clothes. Despite this, the platypuses quickly became the zoo's most popular, and expensive, exhibit.

== Attempted courtship ==
Zookeepers tried repeatedly to get the platypuses to mate. Although the two were separated by a fence in the enclosure, Cecil was able to breach Penelope's side and gain access to her sleeping burrows. According to Time magazine, Cecil would court Penelope by biting onto her flat tail and holding on as Penelope waddled around the pool, dragging him in circles. However, Penelope resisted Cecil's advances. "Penelope does not like Cecil, so their engagement is off, at least until next autumn", wrote the Townsville Bulletin on June 17, 1952. "Penelope took a violent loathing to Cecil, somersaulted violently, scratched endlessly, and exhausted herself by frantically trying to climb the sides of the tank every time Cecil came near her," according to The Daily Telegraph.

Zookeepers were eager to see captive platypuses mate. At this time only one platypus couple, Jack and Jill, had bred in captivity, and that was in their native Australia. In the spring of 1951, when zookeepers put Cecil in Penelope's enclosure, she began behaving with erratic aggression: "scratching furiously with all of her 20 sharp claws," running into the water, and rolling over. The next year, during the North American spring, Penelope was more receptive to Cecil's presence, and at one point even scratched timidly at his side of the enclosure, ironically on Father's Day. The two engaged in "all night orgies of love" for four days, after which Penelope became "snappish and oppressed by the thoughts of future responsibility", bringing an end to their courtship.

== Faking a pregnancy ==
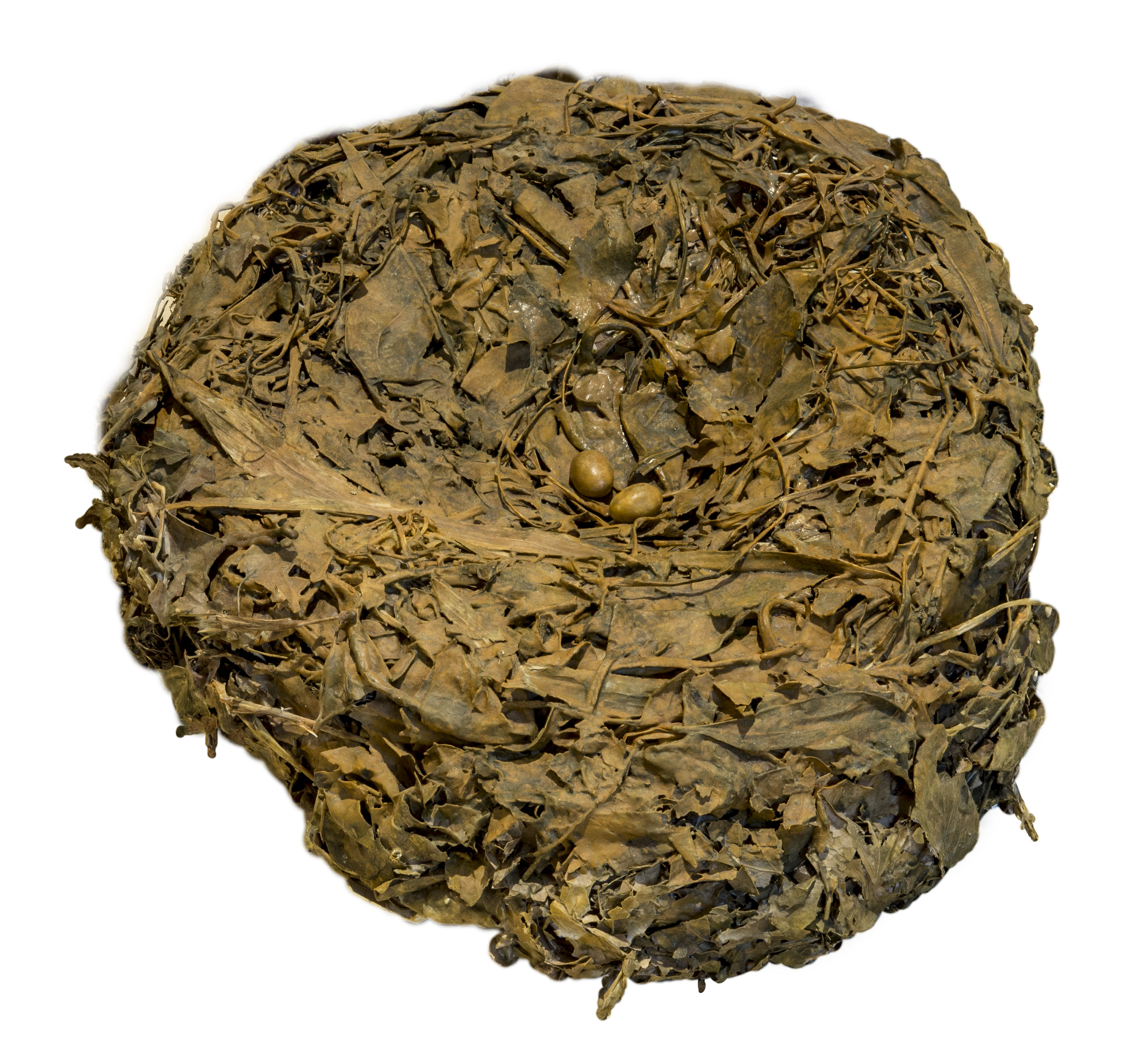
A replica of a platypus nest with eggs.

Penelope made headlines when she began behaving like an expectant mother, as she would have been the first platypus to lay a litter of eggs away from the species' homeland of Australia. Zookeepers became certain that Penelope was guarding young in the mound of dirt where she lived. The first indication of Penelope's pregnancy was when she took eucalyptus leaves into her burrow, since those are the leaves that wild platypuses use to make breeding nests.

On July 9, 1953, Penelope retreated to her burrow and remained there for six days. She then ate a meal that Time magazine described as "enormous". At this point, zookeepers prepared themselves for the possibility of platypus eggs or young, hairless platypus infants who were in the nursing stage. Penelope began eating larger quantities of worms and larvae. Australian zoologists, including David Fleay, expected the young to be ready for the outside world in seventeen weeks. The Daily Telegraph reported that "The only male at the zoo who seems completely unconcerned is Cecil, who keeps to himself in a separate tank and spends most of his time sleeping."

After sixteen weeks, zoo officials grew worried about the survival of the young platypuses as temperatures dropped, and they made plans to explore the mound to see the potential offspring. In the presence of fifty newspaper reporters and photographers, zookeepers dug through the 250 cubic feet (7.1 m^{3}) of earth for hours. After several hours, they unearthed a platypus, and kept digging to find the rest of the litter. However, they found none, and upon closer inspection realized the platypus they held was Penelope, who was identifiable by a nick in her tail. Despite her maternal behavior and increased food consumption, she had not been rearing any young. Zookeepers reported that they "had been duped" by Penelope, accusing her of "posing as an expectant mother just to lead a life of luxury on double rations".

Representatives of Penelope sent a cable to Fleay that said: "No babies this year. There's always next year. — Penelope." Fleay believed that Penelope had indeed hatched young but that "something apparently went wrong".

== Escape from the zoo ==
In July 1957, Penelope escaped the zoo, (Note: Sources differ in exactly when and how Penelope escaped. One source reports she squeezed through a small crack on July 25, and another says she may have climbed over a high wire fence on July 26.) and the zoo assigned a fifteen-person team to search nearby waters including the Bronx River. Though male platypuses have a venomous spur, females do not, making them more vulnerable in the wild. On July 26, 1957, the Bronx Zoo stopped its weeks-long search through the ponds and streams on the premises and announced her "presumed lost and probably dead". The New York Times wrote that Penelope was "believed to have scrambled out of her burrow and escaped over a wire fence in resisting the advances of her mate, Cecil". The New York Times reported that Penelope was not lovesick but "sick of love".

Cecil appeared affected by her disappearance. He spent considerable time scratching his head, an activity he had never done before. He lost weight, and died of no discernible cause the day after the search for Penelope was called off.

== Aftermath ==
Two days after Cecil's death, plans to restock the zoo's platypusary were underway. Several weeks after Penelope disappeared, Australian zoologist David Fleay expressed his disappointment with Penelope and agreed to send more platypuses to New York.

In 1958, the Bronx Zoo received three more platypuses named Paul, Patty, and Pamela. All three died within their first year in North America. The United States did not receive another platypus until 2019, when a pair, a male named Birrarung and a female named Eve, arrived at the San Diego Zoo Safari Park. Eve died on March 18, 2026. As of June 2026, Birrarung is the only platypus on display outside of Australia.
