= Eve (platypus) =

Platypus (2004–2026)

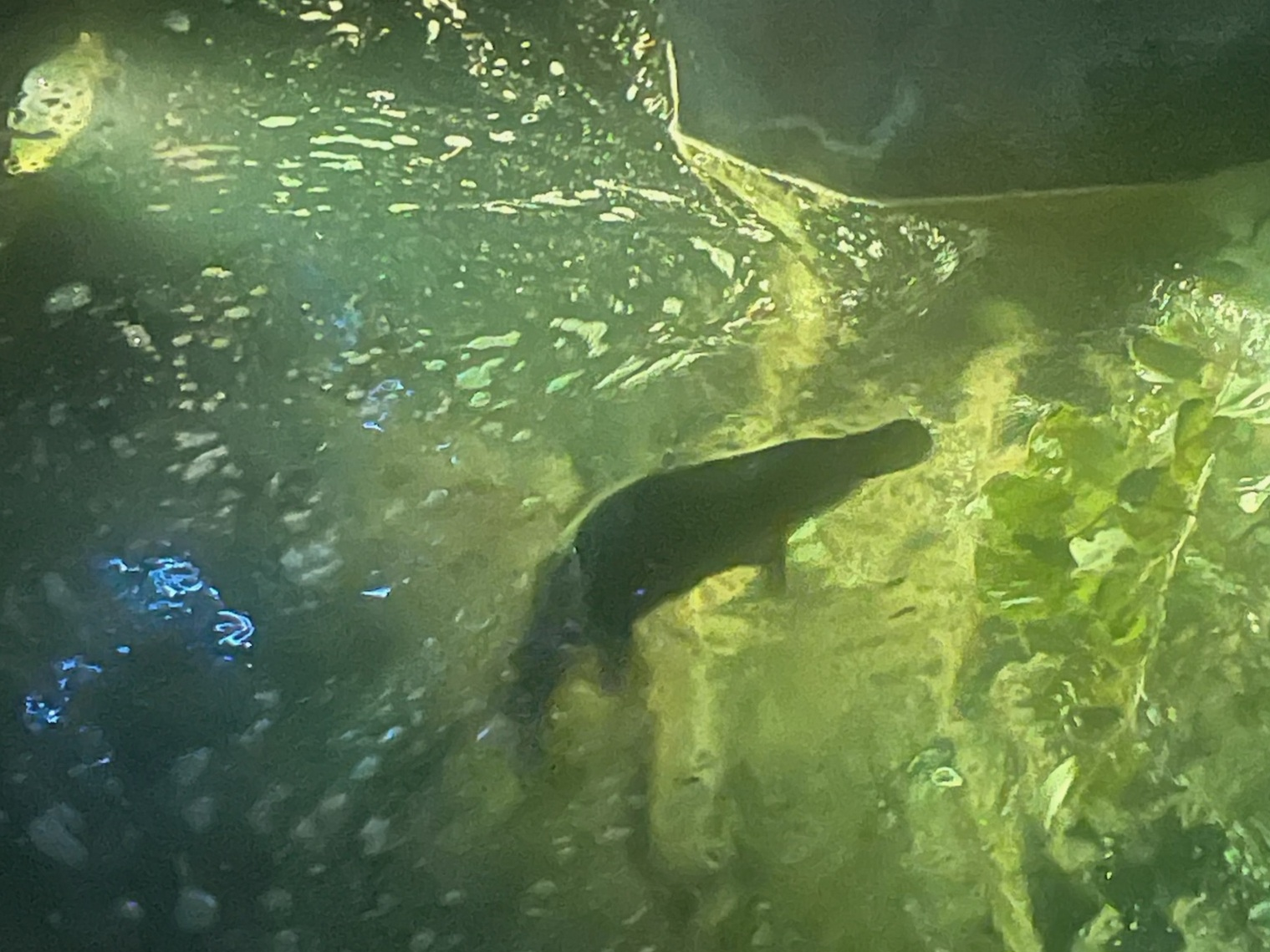
- Eve at the San Diego Zoo Safari Park
- Species: Ornithorhynchus anatinus
- Sex: Female
- Born: October 2004; Taronga Zoo Sydney, Australia
- Died: March 18, 2026 (aged 21)
- Known for: One of two platypuses housed outside Australia (As of 2026)
- Owner: San Diego Zoo Wildlife Alliance
- Residence: San Diego Zoo Safari Park

Eve (October 2004 – March 18, 2026) was a female platypus (Ornithorhynchus anatinus) housed at the San Diego Zoo Safari Park in California. She was among the only platypuses exhibited outside Australia in the 21st century.

== Life and arrival in San Diego ==
One of the platypuses on a rock at the San Diego Zoo Safari Park's enclosure

Eve was hatched in October 2004 at Taronga Zoo in Sydney, Australia. In October 2019, she was transferred to the San Diego Zoo Safari Park along with a male platypus named Birrarung, whose name comes from a river in Australia. Eve's name came from Evelyn, who had been a care specialist for her in Australia. The animals were transported in custom-built crates and accompanied by a keeper to assist their acclimation.

As of December 2019, 15-year-old Eve weighed approximately 2.5 pounds (1.1 kg) and was roughly the length of a human arm from wrist to shoulder.

Within the Walkabout Australia area, the Nelson A. Millsberg Platypus Habitat housed the animals in an enclosure that replicated freshwater conditions and accommodated their nocturnal activity. Eve spent much of the day in a nest box. She was fed a diet of live prey, including crayfish, crickets, ghost shrimp, and worms, and showed a preference for smaller crayfish.

== Death ==
Eve died on March 18, 2026, following treatment for pneumonia. She was approximately 21 years old, slightly exceeding the typical lifespan of a platypus in human care.

== Significance ==
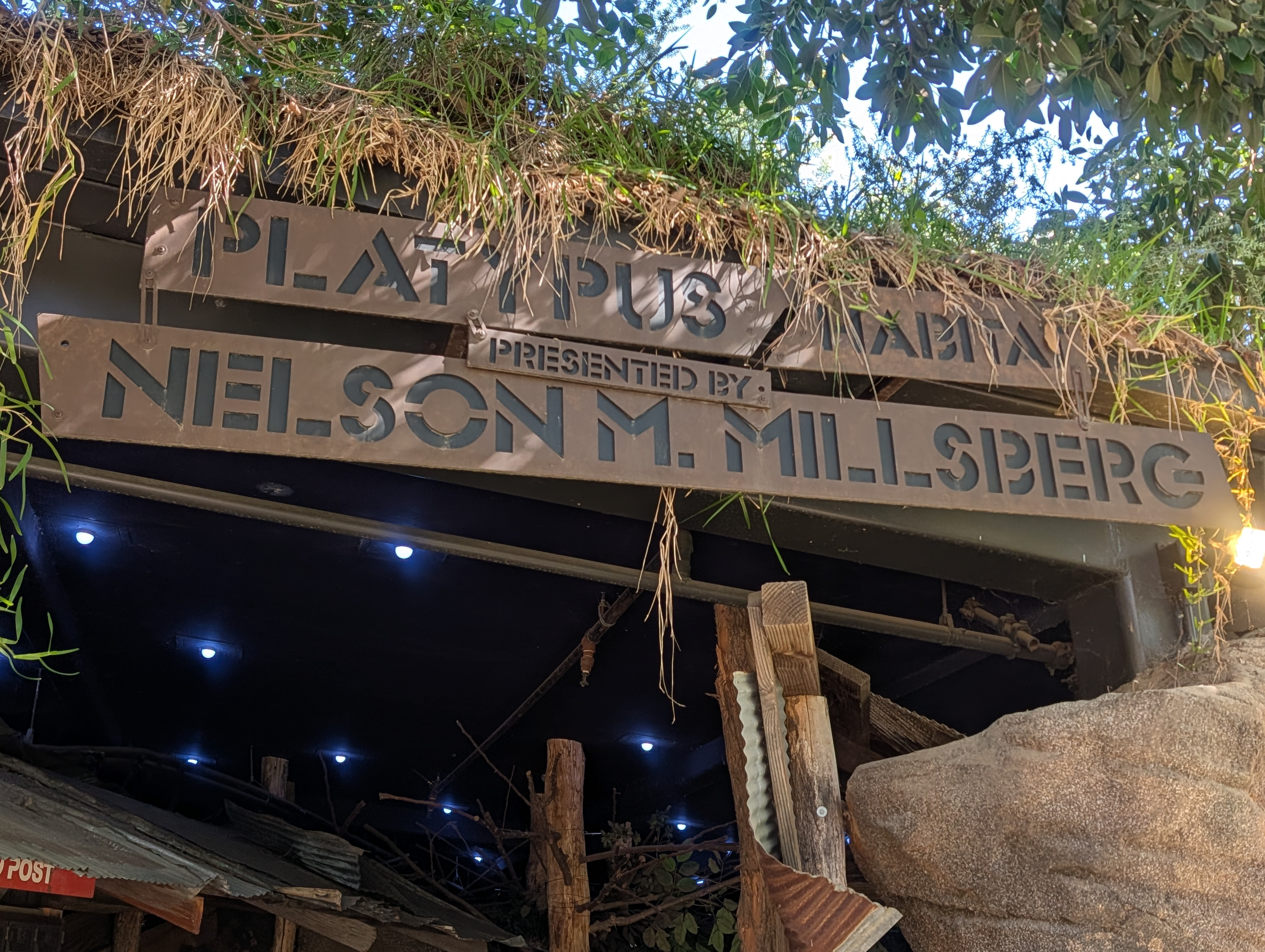
The entrance to the platypus enclosure at the San Diego Zoo Safari Park

When Eve and Birrarung arrived in San Diego, it was the first time in more than half a century that platypuses had been cared for outside of Australia and 60 years since a platypus had been on display in the United States.

Eve was part of a program to study platypus biology and husbandry outside Australia.

== See also ==
- Platypus venom – Venom produced by the platypus
- Penelope (platypus) – Platypus at the Bronx Zoo
