= Osaka (surname) =

Osaka or Ōsaka is a Japanese surname that may refer to

- Go Osaka (逢坂 剛, born 1943), Japanese writer
- Hiroshi Ōsaka (逢坂 浩司, 1963–2007), Japanese animator, character designer and illustrator
- Mari Osaka (born 1996), Japanese tennis player, sister of Naomi
- Masaaki Osaka (大坂 正明), Japanese Communist
- Motokichiro Osaka (逢坂 元吉郎, 1880–1945), Japanese pastor, theologian and newspaper columnist
- Naomi Osaka (born 1997), Japanese tennis player, sister of Mari
- Nozomi Ōsaka (逢坂 望美), Japanese manga artist
- Ryōta Ōsaka (逢坂 良太, born 1986), Japanese voice actor and radio personality

Fictional characters

- Naru Osaka, character from Sailor Moon
- Shizuku Ōsaka (桜坂 しずく), a character from the media project Love Live! Nijigasaki High School Idol Club
