= Jacques Savorgnan de Brazza =

Jacques Savorgnan di Brazza
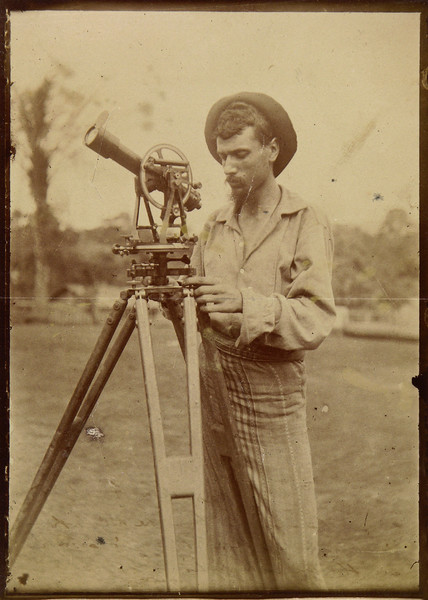
- Savorgnan di Brazzà with a theodolite
- Born: 14 December 1859; Rome, Papal States
- Died: 29 February 1888 (aged 28); Rome, Italy
- Occupation: Naturalist
- Known for: African explorations

Jacques Savorgnan di Brazza (or Giacomo Savorgnan de Brazza e Cergneu; 14 December 1859 – 29 February 1888) was an Italian naturalist, mountaineer and explorer, younger brother of Pierre Savorgnan de Brazza.

== Early years ==
Giacomo Savorgnan di Brazzà was born in Rome on 14 December 1859, the 12th of 13 children. His parents were Ascanio Savorgnan di Brazzà, a sculptor and painter who had studied under Antonio Canova, and Giacinta Simonetti, Marquise of Gavignano. His father came from a liberal family which owned houses in Brazzacco (Moruzzo), Udine and Soleschiano (Manzano). He was descended from the old nobility of Friuli. The family moved to Rome in 1870 and he studied first at the Roman College, then at the school in Bressanone, then returned to Rome to complete his secondary education. He attended the Faculty of Science in Rome, where he obtained a degree in 1882.

== Alpine explorations ==
Influenced by his father, who had travelled in the east, and by his brother Pietro, Brazzà was always interested in travel and exploration. As a student he made many excursion in Friuli to collect specimens for the Botanical Garden of Rome, including live alpine plants. In 1880 he spent two months climbing in the Carnic Alps and the Tauern, and gained a reputation in mountaineering circles. He joined the Friulian Alpine Society, a group of young mountaineers interested in geographical and naturalistic research. He became a close friend of the society's president, Giovanni Marinelli. In 1880–1881 he studied the Canin Glacier, which until then had been thought to be a snowfield rather than a glacier, and the Raccolana Valley. The results of his topographical, geomorphological and naturalistic research were published in 1883 in the Bollettino of the Società Geografica Italiana (Italian Geographic Society).

== Africa ==
In 1882 Brazzà was commissioned by the French government to carry out naturalistic research in the Congo, collecting botanical, zoological and geological specimens for the Museum of Natural History in Paris. He followed his brother Pietro on his second African expedition, leaving on 1 January 1883 and staying in Africa until April 1886. His diary recorded travel impressions, naturalistic observations and notes on the physical conditions and social customs of the local people. Although his original mandate was to collect specimens of the flora, fauna and minerals, he was later entrusted with true exploration. He travelled through the Ogooué River basin and up the Congo. On 24 November 1884 the Belgians Guillaume Casman and Charles Liebrechts reached Msuata on the Congo, where they met Brazzà and Attilio Pécile, who were going by canoe to the Alima River.

== Last years and legacy ==
After his return in 1886 Brazzà exhibited the scientific results of his mission, documented in his diaries and illustrated by photographs and drawings, in important venues. He earned various honors including the Legion of Honour of France. Although he planned to return to Africa, his health was broken by the expedition. He died of scarlet fever in Rome on 29 February 1888.

The Pigorini National Museum of Prehistory and Ethnography in Rome and the Musée de l'Homme in Paris have collections of Brazzà's specimens and anthropological materials. Pentadiplandra brazzeana was first described by French botanist and physician Henri Ernest Baillon in 1886, who assigned it to the family Capparaceae, based on a specimen from Osika in Congo collected by Brazza. De Brazza's monkey (Cercopithecus neglectus) was named after him. It was known as Cercopithecus brazzae (Milne-Edwards, 1886) for many years until it was found that it belonged to the taxon named by Schlegel in 1876. It is also known as Schlegel's Monkey. (Note: The fish Enteromius brazzai, however, is named in honor of Giacomo's brother Pietro.)

== Sources ==
- Beolens, Bo; Watkins, Michael; Grayson, Michael (2009-11-18), "De Brazza", The Eponym Dictionary of Mammals, JHU Press, ISBN 978-0-8018-9533-3
- Bonacini, Carlo (23 November 2016), "Giacomo Savorgnan", Artestampa Edizioni srl (in Italian)
- Brazza, Fabiana di; Simonetto, Luca (2016), "BRAZZÀ (DI) SAVORGNAN GIACOMO", Dizionario Biografico dei Friulani (in Italian), Istituto Pio Paschini per la storia della Chiesa in Friuli
- Coosemans, M. (21 May 1948), "CASMAN (Guillaume-Camille)" (PDF), Biographie Belge d'Outre-Mer (in French), vol. II, Académie Royale des Sciences d'Outre-Mer, pp. 143–147
- Pentadiplandra brazzeana Baill., Muséum national d'histoire naturelle
- Scharpf, Christopher; Lazara, Kenneth J. (22 September 2018), "Order CYPRINIFORMES: Family CYPRINIDAE: Subfamily SMILIOGASTRINAE", The ETYFish Project Fish Name Etymology Database, Christopher Scharpf and Kenneth J. Lazara, archived from the original on 4 May 2022
