= Osika =

Osika is a Slavic surname. Notable people with the surname include:

- Anton Osika (born 1990), Swedish entrepreneur
- Craig Osika (born 1979), American football player
- Ron Osika (born 1939), Canadian politician
- Shannon Osika (born 1993), American middle-distance runner

== See also ==
- Osaka (surname)
