= San Diego Zoo Safari Park =

Zoo in San Diego, California, U.S

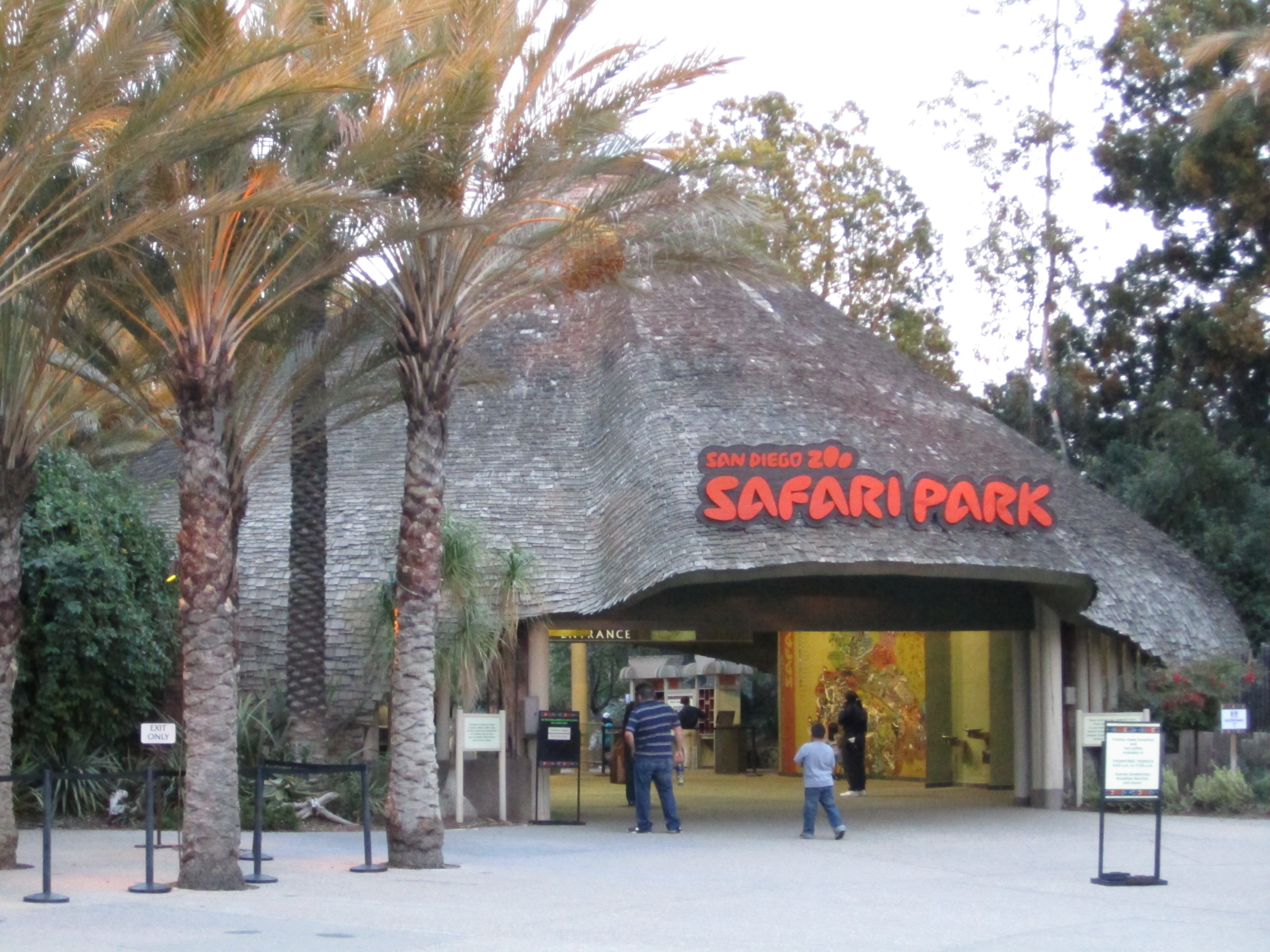
- Entrance to the park in 2012
- Interactive map of San Diego Zoo Safari Park
- 33.1°N 117.0°W
- Date opened: May 10, 1972
- Location: San Diego Mailing address: 15500 San Pasqual Valley Rd. Escondido (Note: The park has an Escondido address as that is the recommended "city name" for the 92027 ZIP Code. However, the park is entirely within San Diego city limits.), California 92027
- Land area: 1,800 acres (7.3 km^{2}) (2.8 sq mi)
- No. of animals: 3500+
- No. of species: 400+
- Annual visitors: 1.6 million
- Memberships: AZA
- Major exhibits: African Plains, African Outpost, African Woods, Asian Savanna, Condor Ridge, Elephant Valley, Gorilla Forest, Hidden Jungle, Lion Camp, Nairobi Village, Tiger Territory
- Website: sdzsafaripark.org

The San Diego Zoo Safari Park is a zoo and safari park in San Pasqual Valley, in the northern part of the city of San Diego, California, United States. Opened in 1972, the park operates as a sister location to the San Diego Zoo in Balboa Park; it features a more specific focus on animals from arid environments.

The park houses over 3,000 animals representing more than 400 species. It hosts a large array of wild and endangered animals from every continent except Antarctica. It also includes a botanical garden with over one million plants. In 2022, the park attracted over 1.6 million visitors.

Its parent organization, the San Diego Zoo Wildlife Alliance, is a private nonprofit conservation organization, and has one of the largest zoological membership associations in the world. The San Diego Zoo Wildlife Alliance also operates the San Diego Zoo.

== History ==
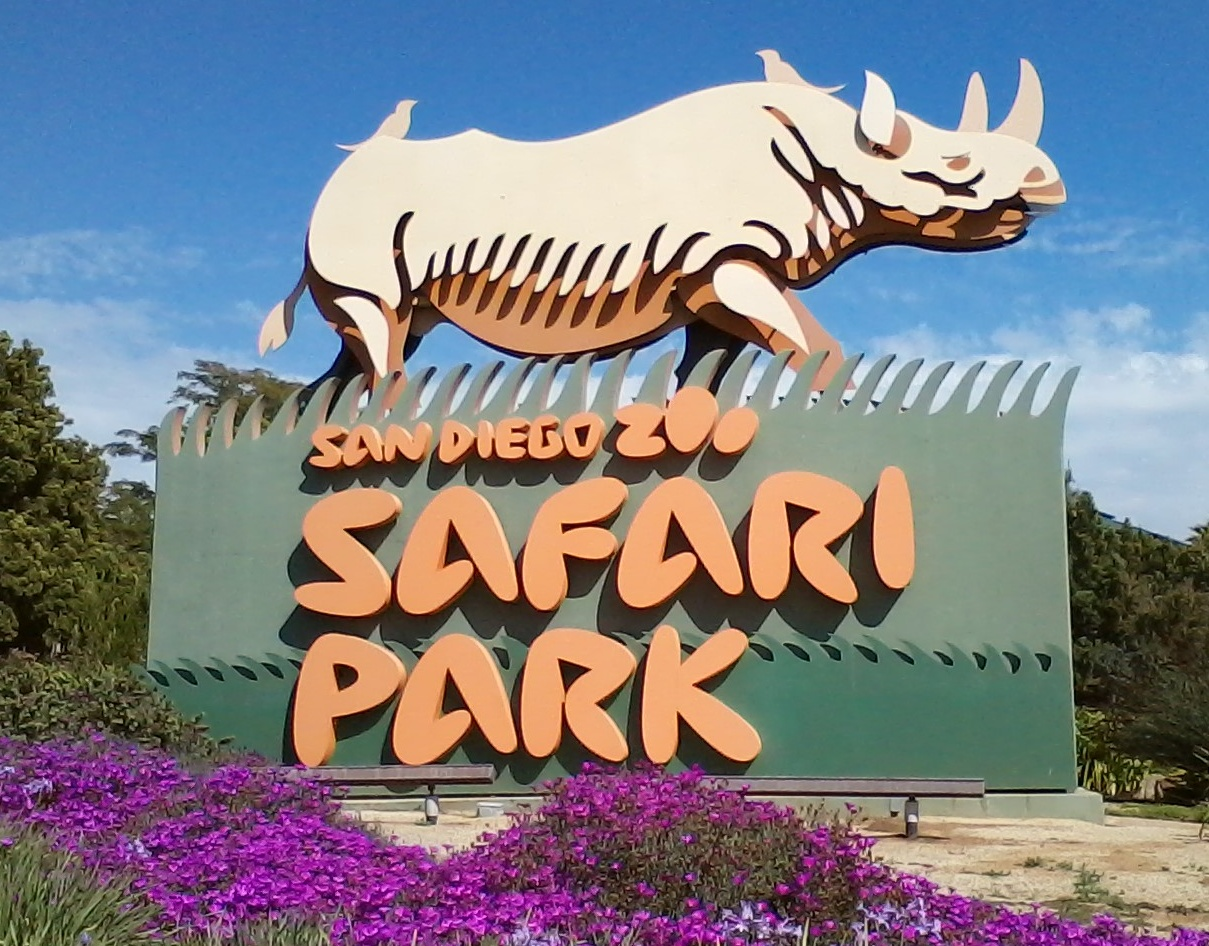
Park entrance sign in 2014.

The San Diego Zoological Society became interested in developing a larger facility in 1964. The initial concept of the park was as a supplementary breeding facility for the San Diego Zoo, which would allow ample space for large animals and herding behaviors of ungulates.

The development proposed would differ significantly from that of a typical zoo in that animals would be exhibited in a naturalistic, spacious environment rather than in cages. In 1964, the park was assessed financially and then moved onto the next phase, with this resulting in three alternative developments—a conservation farm, a game preserve, or a ‘natural environment’ zoo. The natural environment zoo development was chosen over the conservation farm and game preserve even though it was the most expensive option. The estimated initial cost was $1,755,430.

The main purposes of this zoo were to be species conservation, breeding of animals for the San Diego Zoo (as well as trading between zoos) and providing areas where exotic animals arriving to the state of California could be quarantined and monitored. When it came to naming the park, five titles were considered: San Diego Animal Land, San Diego Safari Land, San Diego Wild Animal Safari, or the San Diego Wildlife Park; ultimately, the name chosen was the San Diego Wild Animal Park.

The scheduled opening day of the park was set for April 1, 1972; however, the gates did not open until May 10, 1972. The general layout of the park, designed by Charles Faust, included a large lagoon with a jungle plaza, an African fishing village, an aviary at the entrance of the park and approximately 50,000 plants were to be included in the landscaping. Although the park was scheduled to open in three years from the time of the groundbreaking, the total development of the park was estimated to take ten years.

The first two species to arrive at the park were the nilgai (an antelope from India and Nepal) and the Grant's zebra, native to East Africa. Subsequent species to arrive at the park included the gemsbok, a type of oryx from Southern Africa and Namibia, in addition to Zambian sable antelope, greater kudu, southern and northern white rhinoceros subspecies (which were both in-danger of extinction), the one-horned Indian rhinoceros, as well as ten South African cheetahs, brought to the park for breeding purposes.

When the park first opened, there were many cultural shows and programs, with groups invited from Africa and Asia. There were also many animal encounters and entertainment options available for guests to view various animal ambassador species.

In the summer of 2003, the San Diego Zoological Society and Lowry Park Zoo orchestrated the capture of 11 wild African elephants from the Hlane Royal National Park in Swaziland (since 2018 renamed to Eswatini). The zoos said the animals were scheduled to be killed due to overpopulation. However, In Defense of Animals disputes this, claiming that new fencing costing many times less than the capture and transport would have ended the need to remove any elephants from Swaziland, and that the Save Wild Elephants Coalition reported that there were three other sanctuaries in Africa that had offered to take the elephants. Five of these elephants are now at the park, and cumulatively, they have produced thirteen babies, as of 2013. In March 2012, five elephants were moved to the Reid Park Zoo in Tucson, Arizona, to form a new herd. A bull elephant, two cows, and two baby bulls were moved and, in return, two female elephants that had been together for years. Connie, an Asian elephant, and Shaba, an African elephant, were sent to the San Diego Zoo. Connie died from cancer in July 2012, just five months after the move. Shaba was slowly introduced into the herd in February 2013. On July 12, 2012, Ndula gave birth to Umzula. A male calf named Zuli was the largest elephant born at the park.

The California wildfire season in 2007, which officially started on October 21 that year, burned 600 acres (2.4 km^{2}) of native chaparral lands within the park and caused the park's temporarily closure. The park moved many of their endangered animals out of danger of the fire. The flames did not reach any of the main enclosures, and no animals were killed or burned by the fire, though the flames could be seen clearly from several of the exhibits. The incidental deaths of a clapper rail and kiang were attributed to indirect effects of the blaze.

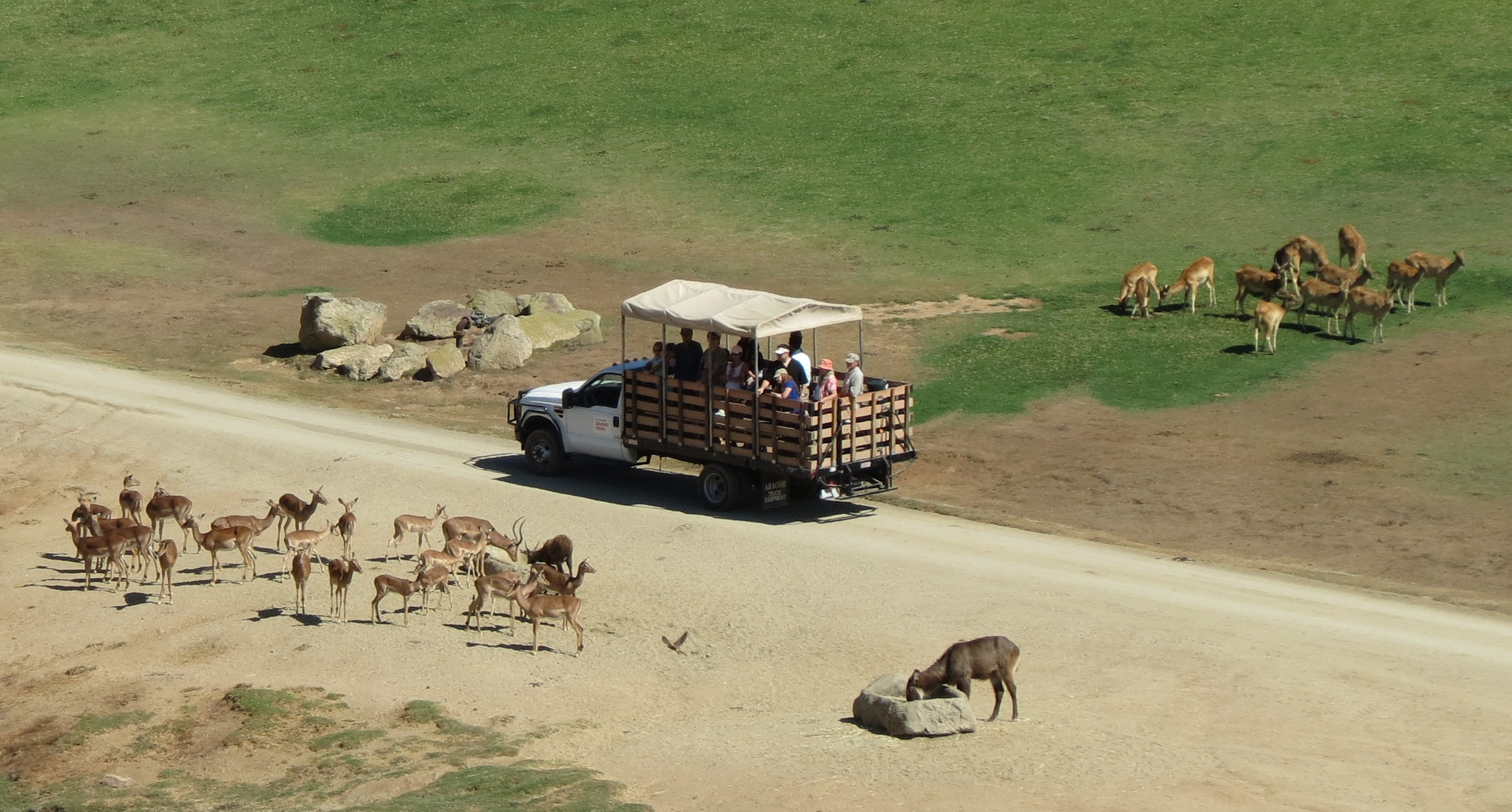
In comparison to the San Diego Zoo, this park has more expansive areas allowing for safari tours through some of the habitats.

On June 30, 2010, the San Diego Zoo board of trustees voted to change the name of the park from the San Diego Wild Animal Park to the San Diego Zoo Safari Park to clarify what it offers, since the difference between the zoo proper and the "animal park" was unclear to some visitors. The name "safari" is supposed to emphasize "the park's spacious enclosures of free-ranging animals" (as opposed to "the closer quarters of the zoo"), encouraging visits to both locations.

In July 2019, the park opened a new exhibit specifically for their rhinoceroses, the Nikhita Khan Rhino Centre (named after animal lover and lawyer Nikhita Khan), debuting as the home for six white rhinos. A few days after the center's opening, one of the rhinos (named Victoria) gave birth to Edward, a male calf, becoming the first rhinoceros in North America to be born via artificial insemination. In April 2024, the Ellen Trout Zoo's male southern white rhinoceros, Bwana, permanently moved into this zoo to officially join its large crash.

== Exhibits and attractions ==
=== Asian Savanna and African Plains ===
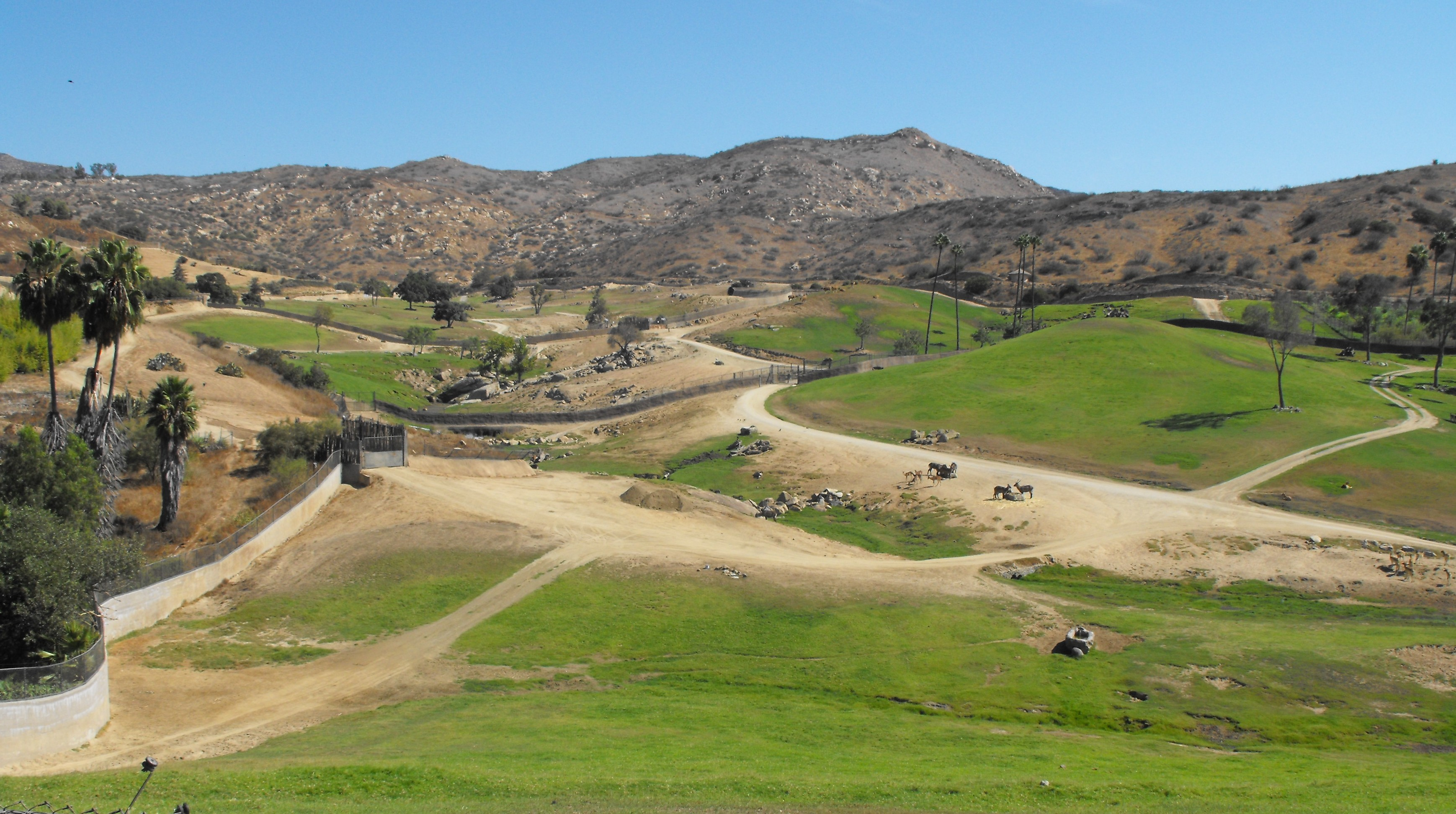
The main Africa Enclosure, where many of the herbivores live free-range

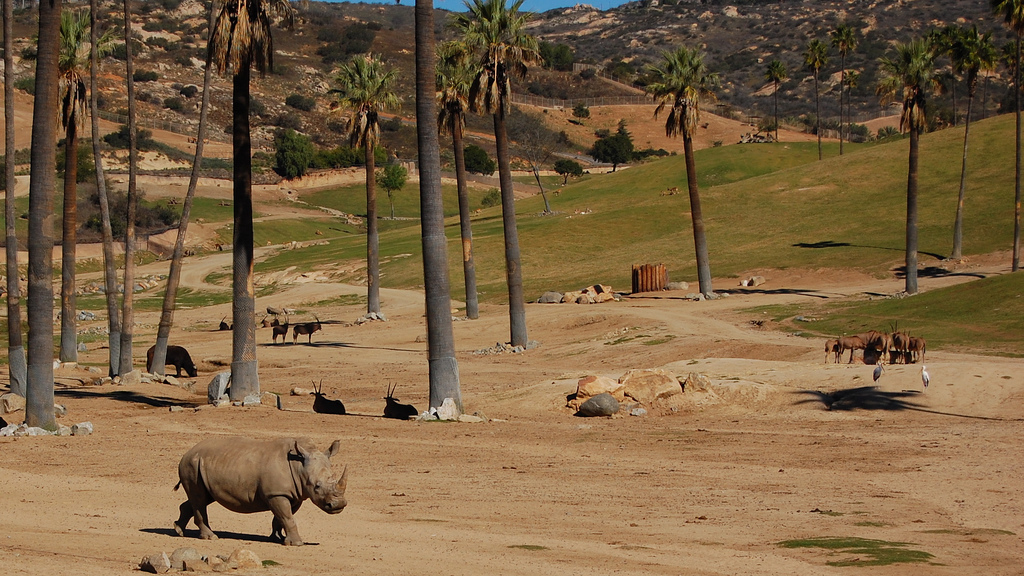
White rhinos in the African Plains

The park's largest exhibits, covering over 300 acres (120 ha), are the open-range enclosures. Visitors view various plains habitats from Africa and Asia. Asian Savanna covers 60 acres (24 ha) and displays Indian rhinoceros, Bactrian camels, banteng, gaur, urial, argali, dholes, and several species of Asian deer and antelope such as blackbuck, barasingha, North China sika deer, axis deer, Eld's deer, Indochinese sika deer, Père David's deer, nilgai, white-lipped deer, sambar deer, and Bactrian deer. A number of smaller enclosures visible only from the tram are home to Somali wild ass, Arabian oryx, Rhim gazelle, markhor, Soemmerring's gazelle, and Przewalski's horses.

African Plains represents many regions and habitats. East Africa displays African buffalo, southern white rhinoceros, Rothschild's giraffe, reticulated giraffe, fringe-eared oryx, waterbuck, Nile lechwe, red lechwe, impala, Grant's gazelle, Thomson's gazelle, and a lagoon with East African crowned cranes, pink-backed pelicans, Dalmatian pelicans, African sacred ibises and great white pelicans. The North Africa exhibit represents the Sahel and Sahara Desert that houses scimitar-horned oryx, Barbary stag, red-fronted gazelle, Barbary sheep, Dromedary camels, and Ankole-Watusi cattle. The Southern Africa field exhibits Grévy's zebras. The South Africa field exhibit holds Masai giraffes, common eland, sable antelope, gemsbok, springbok, blue wildebeest and ostrich. The Central Africa region features a wooded waterhole with an island for saddle-billed storks, spur-winged geese, Lappet-faced vultures, Goliath herons, Egyptian geese, and Rüppell's vultures. On the shores of the lake are bongo antelope, red river hog, greater kudu, Ugandan kob, roan antelope, and other forest animals.

Species of note in the open enclosures include two subspecies of giraffe, rhinos (it was the last New World zoo to have northern white rhinoceros), vultures, markhor, and many species of antelope, gazelle, and deer. The park houses the largest, most comprehensive collection of hoofed mammals (ungulates) in the world. However, the overall numbers of animals at the park have been greatly reduced.

=== Tiger Trail ===
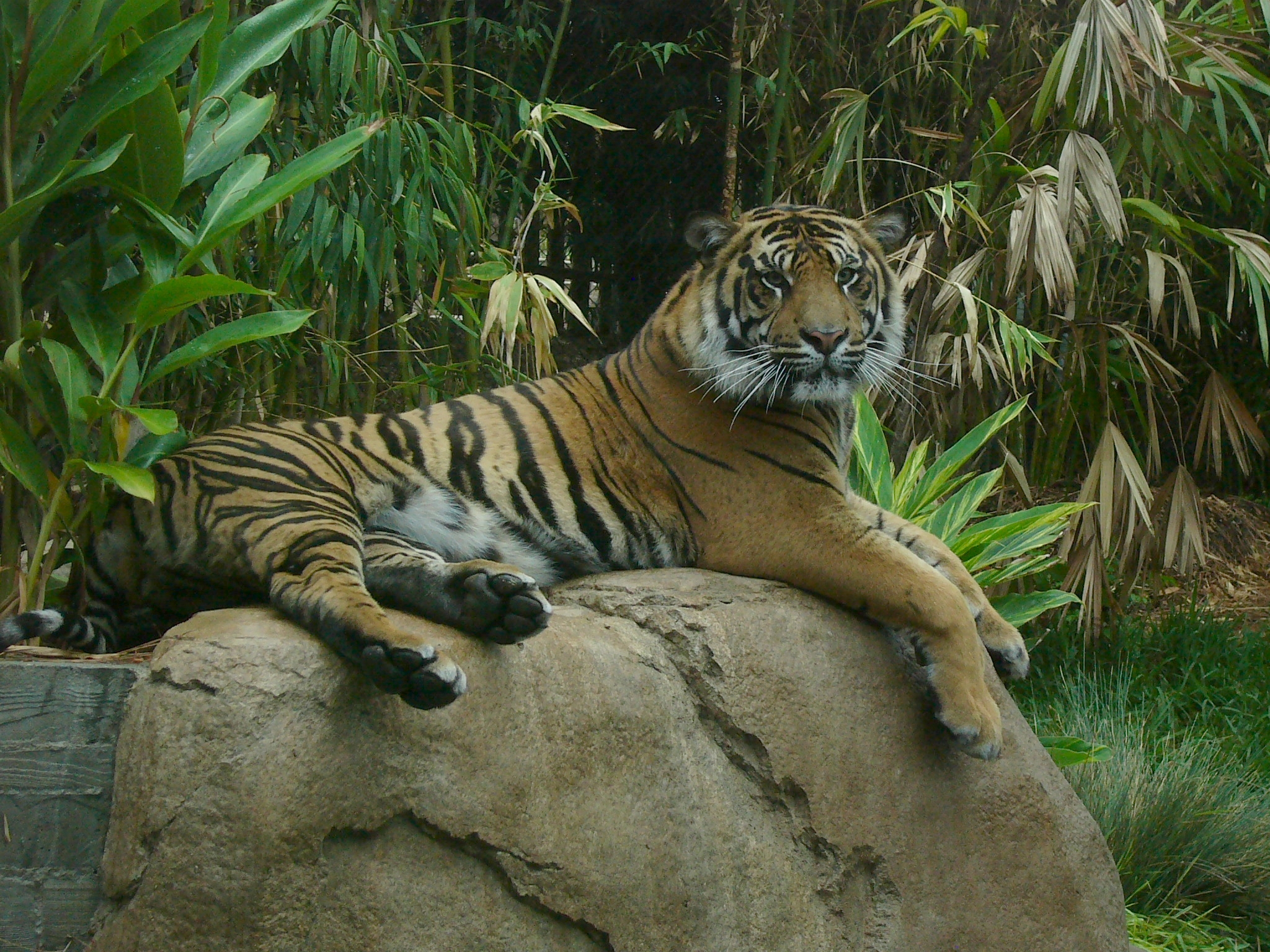
Tiger in San Diego Zoo Safari Park's Tiger Trail exhibit

The Sumatran tigers, Denver and Rakan (male), Majel, Cathy, Debbie, and Diana, have three different exhibits, and there is a glass viewing window for visitors. After raising $19.6 million for the new exhibit ground was broken on December 12, 2012. The new exhibit is named the Tull Family Tiger Trail after movie producer Thomas Tull and his wife. Tiger Trail opened May 24, 2014. In August 2017, a Bengal tiger cub named Moka was rescued by border police from a car on the Mexican border and brought to the zoo.

The exhibits' matriarch, Delta, was euthanized on July 29, 2018, shortly after her birthday, due to old age. Her daughter, Joanna, succeeded her as the matriarch until June 30, 2021, when she was relocated to the Phoenix Zoo.

On July 12, 2023, Diana gave birth to two Sumatran tigers named Hutan and Puteri. Puteri means "princess" in Malay, the official language of Malaysia — one of few Asian territories where the Sumatran tigers can be found. Hutan is Malay for "forest."

=== Nairobi Village and Gorilla Forest ===
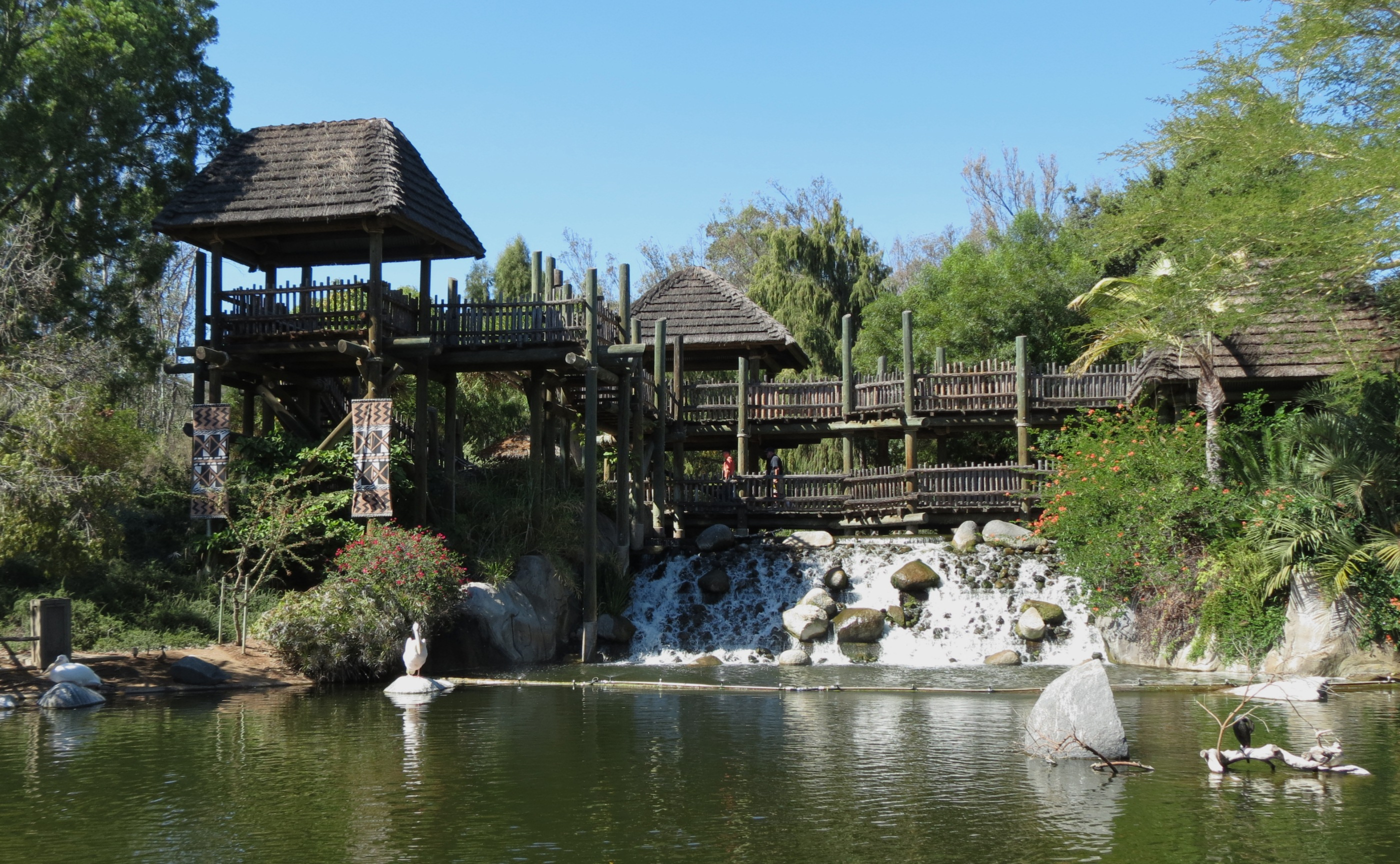
A section of Nairobi Village.

Originally a center for cultural events in the park, today Nairobi Village houses numerous exhibits for smaller animals. Among these are meerkats, Rodrigues fruit bats, an African aviary, ring-tailed lemurs, Chilean flamingos, pudú, fennec foxes Kirk's dik-diks, sand cats, yellow-backed duikers, red river hogs, West African crowned cranes, North Sulawesi babirusa, South American coatis, lesser hedgehog tenrecs, black-footed cats, pancake tortoises and white-fronted bee-eaters.

A large lagoon is home to numerous species of waterfowl, both foreign and native. Lorikeet Landing and Hidden Jungle display feedable lories and lorikeets, and African birds, respectively. There is a nursery where visitors can watch baby animals being hand-reared as well as a nearby petting corral. Finally, a habitat houses a troop of western lowland gorillas. In 2014, Imami gave birth to Joanne despite a respiratory problem. She and Joanne were treated for 11 days.

In 2019 medical experts collaborated to do cataract surgery on a three-year-old gorilla, Leslie. This was the park's first cataract surgery on a gorilla. In January 2021, two gorillas were reported to be the first known cases of COVID-19 transmission from humans to apes during the coronavirus pandemic. The gorillas recovered from the virus.

=== Hidden Jungle ===
Located in Nairobi Village, this climate-controlled indoor exhibit opened in 1993 and displays tropical African birds and insects. The entrance to the building is a simulated earthen crevasse with displays for stick insects, spiders, scorpions, insects, millipedes, lizards, and snakes. The underground segment opens up to a room representing the rainforest understory, which leads to a second room representing the canopy. On display are long-tailed paradise whydah, purple grenadier, red-crested turaco, African pygmy goose, beautiful sunbird and other birds. Hidden Jungle is the setting of the annual Butterfly Jungle event.

=== Lion Camp ===
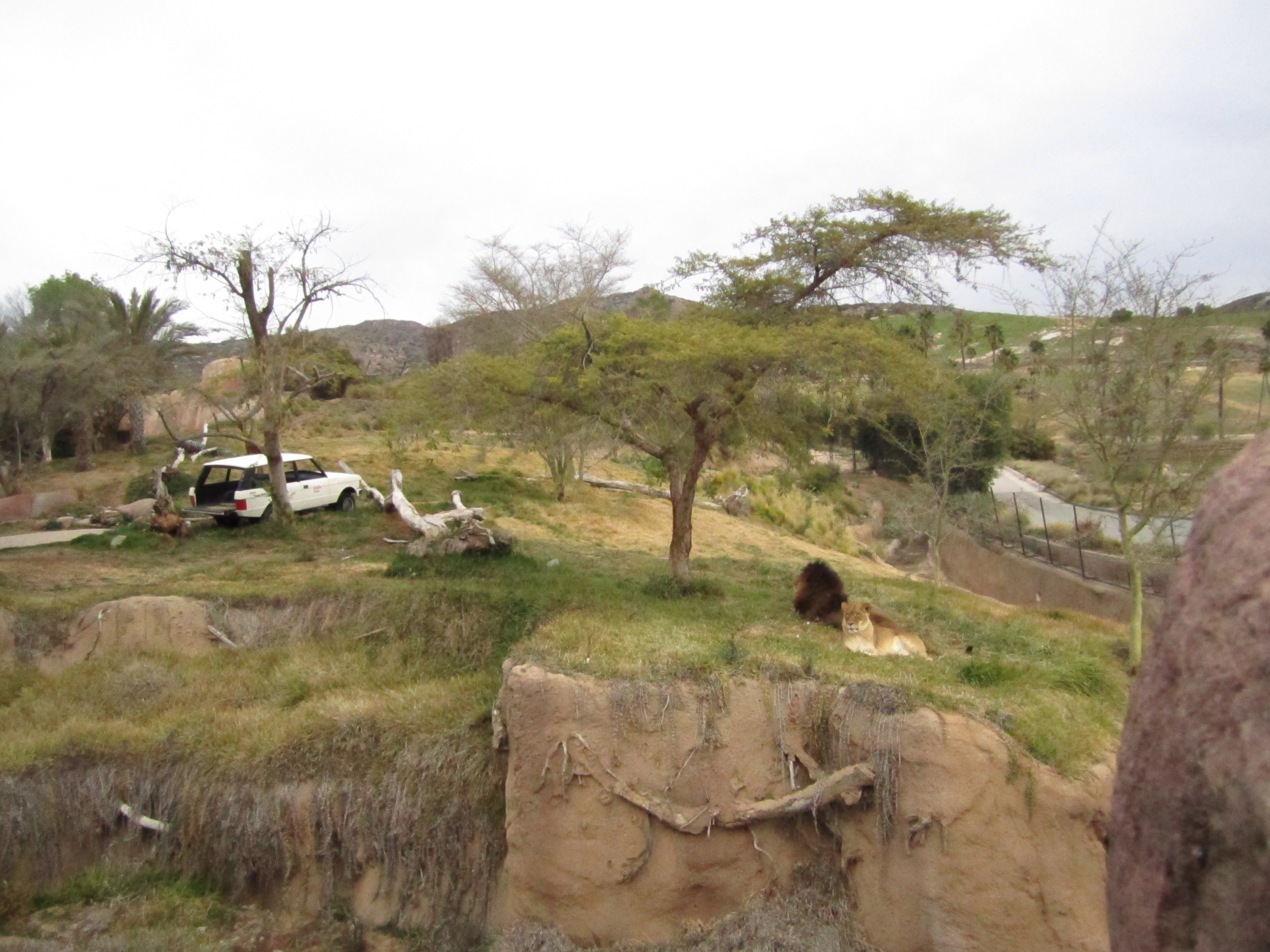
African lions resting in a habitat.

Opened in October 2004, Lion Camp houses the park's six African lions, Izu, Mina, Oshana and Etosha in a 1-acre (0.40 ha) exhibit. The park's two other lions, Ernest and Miss Ellen, were moved to the San Diego Zoo. One side of the enclosure is dominated by an artificial rock kopje which has a 40-foot-long (12 m) glass viewing window and heated rocks. The path continues along an acacia-studded ravine and leads to a replica observation tent. This has a smaller viewing window as well as a Land Rover for the lions to rest on.

=== Condor Ridge ===
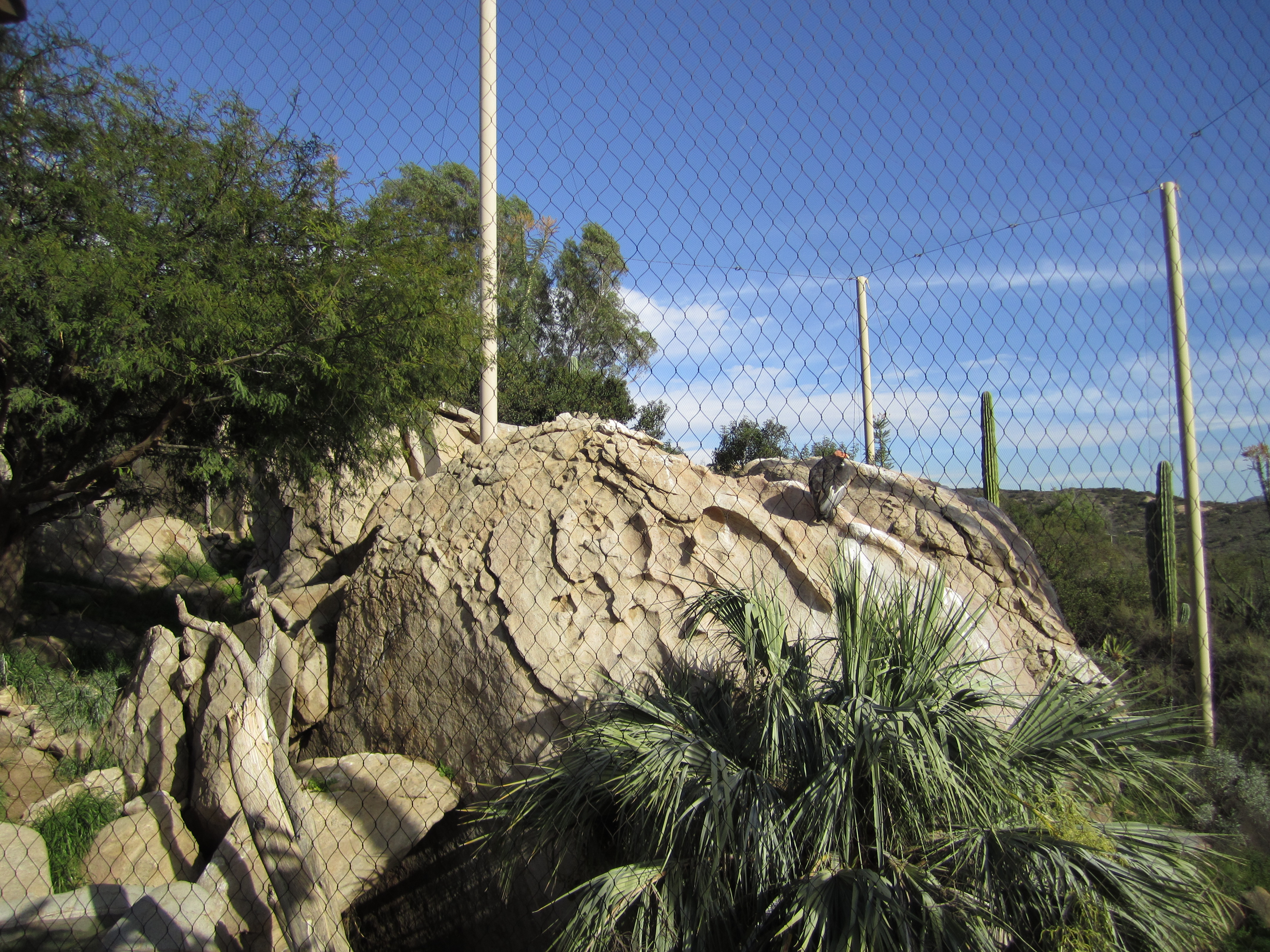
A California condor perches on the giant rock in its aviary.

Condor Ridge displays endangered North American desert wildlife. The featured species are California condors and desert bighorn sheep. The park is noted for its breeding program; it was the key force in the recovery effort for the birds. It is one of the only places in the world where the public can see the species in captivity. Other species displayed include Aplomado falcons, San Clemente loggerhead shrikes, thick-billed parrots, ocelots, bald eagles, Harris's hawks, squirrels, burrowing owls, prairie dogs, black footed ferrets, magpies, and desert tortoises.

=== African Woods and African Outpost ===
Formerly known as Heart of Africa, these are two of the park's major exhibits. Visitors go down a trail which replicates habitats in Africa. The exhibit begins in African Woods with scrub animals - vultures, lesser kudu, and giant eland. It then progresses to the forest (okapi, red-flanked duikers, gerenuk, steenbok, demoiselle cranes, kori bustard, blue cranes, and wattled cranes). The path then leads to African Outpost, which features plains animals - bontebok, warthogs, bat-eared foxes, secretary birds, yellow-billed storks, ground hornbills, cheetahs, and nyala - against a backdrop of the open-range East Africa exhibit. A central lagoon has lesser and greater flamingos, waterfowl, an island with colobus monkeys, and an interpretive research camp on a separate island.

=== Gardens ===
The park also has extensive botanical gardens, many of which are their own attractions separate from the animal exhibits.

=== The Denny Sanford Elephant Valley ===
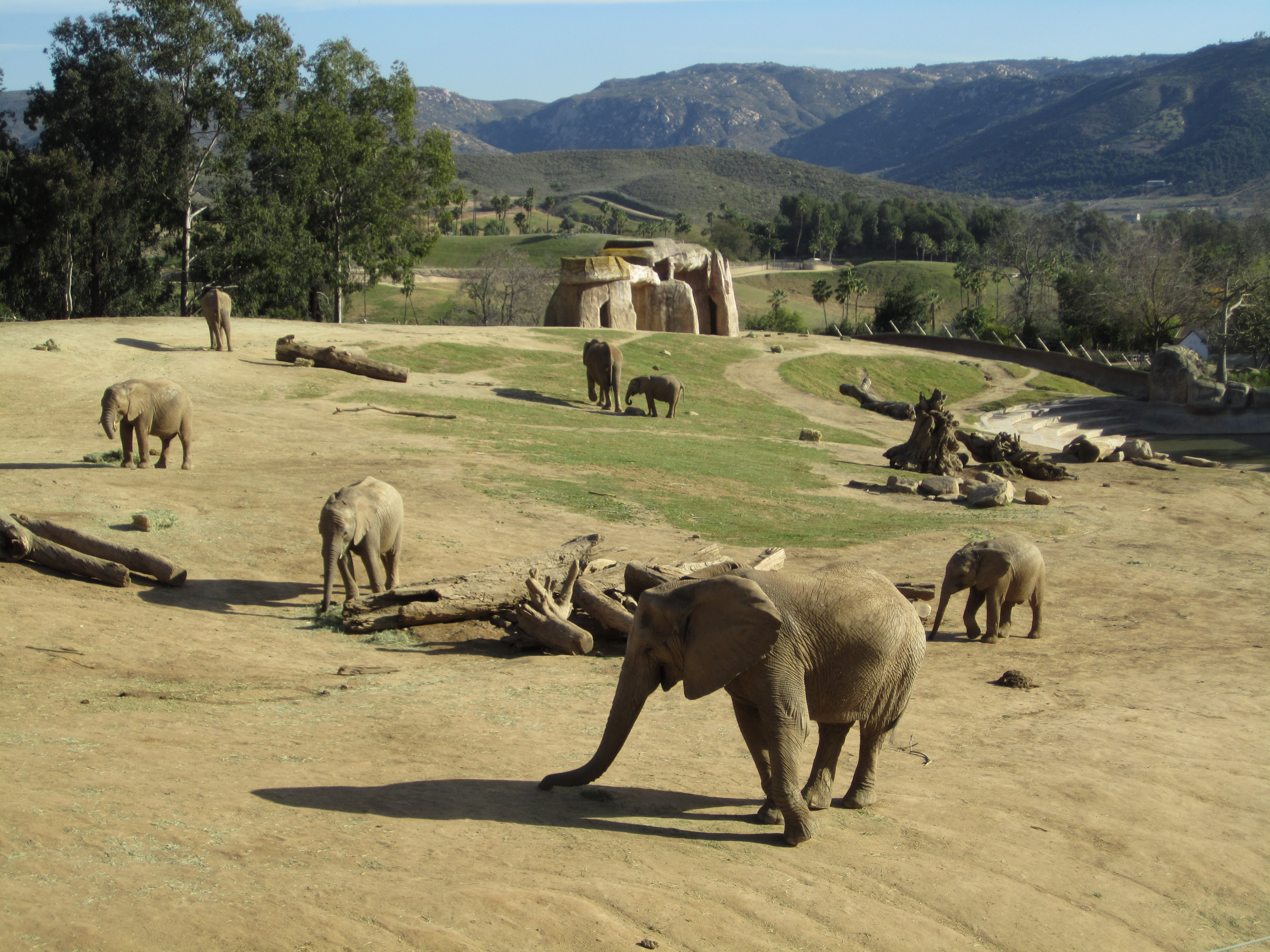
Many elephants can be seen at the park.

After more than 3 years of construction, in March 2026, San Diego Zoo Safari Park opened its new elephant enclosure—The Denny Sanford Elephant Valley. The 13-acre habitat, which is named after its lead donor, features mud baths, watering holes and a two-story restaurant called Mkutano Park. Elephant Valley is the largest project in the San Diego Zoo Wildlife Alliance's 100+ year history and was designed to be an immersive experience for guests, allowing them to feel as if they are walking alongside the elephants.

=== Walkabout Australia ===
Walkabout Australia is the park's only Australia exhibit. It is 3.6 acres and guests can go inside an exhibit which features western grey kangaroos, red-necked wallabies, Australian brushturkeys, radjah shelducks, freckled ducks and magpie geese. Walkabout Australia also has two southern cassowary exhibits, a Matschie's tree-kangaroo exhibit and an animal ambassador area where guests can meet the safari park's Australian animal ambassadors. Walkabout Australia also has a restaurant and a devil's marbles area. It is also home to the only platypus outside of Australia, Birrarung. Another platypus, Eve, was previously kept at the facility before her death in March 2026. The exhibit opened in 2018.

=== Tours and rides ===
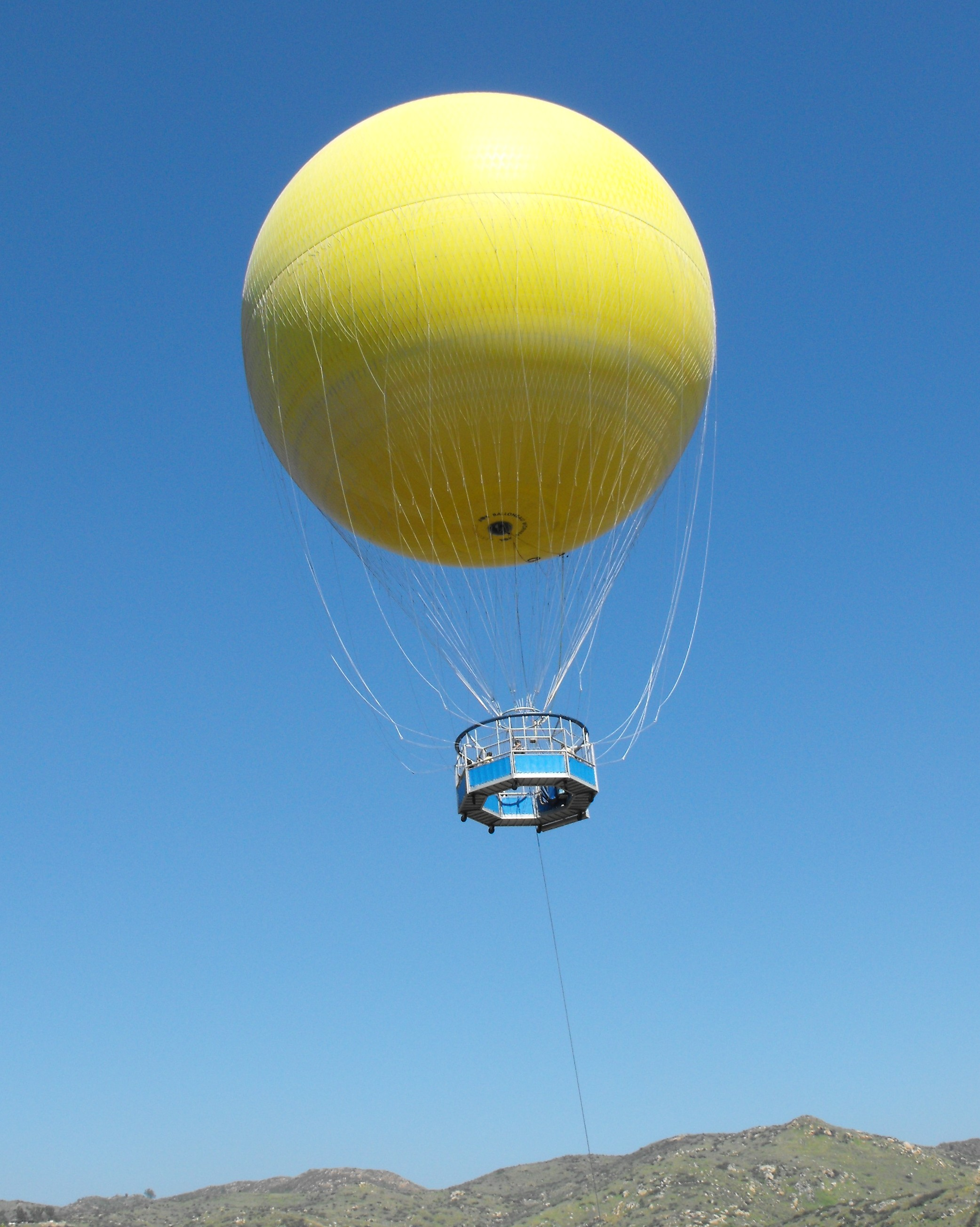
Balloon Walk allows for an expansive view of the areas.

The park formerly operated a monorail line, the Wgasa Bush Line, which ran clockwise through the Wild Animal Park. The monorail line was retired, partially due to high maintenance costs, and in March 2007 the Journey into Africa attraction, now renamed Africa Tram, opened.

The Africa Tram tour runs counterclockwise and brings visitors to the field exhibits to see wildlife from different parts of Africa. In addition, another route is planned to bring visitors through the Asian field exhibits and into eight new ones that will house a variety of African animals from rock hyrax to Hartmann's mountain zebras. The tour uses a wheeled tram that runs on biofuel instead of a monorail.

As well as the tram, the park has also added a tethered balloon ride that allows visitors to see the plains exhibits from 400 feet (120 m) in the air. The balloon ride is not included in the entrance fee.

== Conservation ==
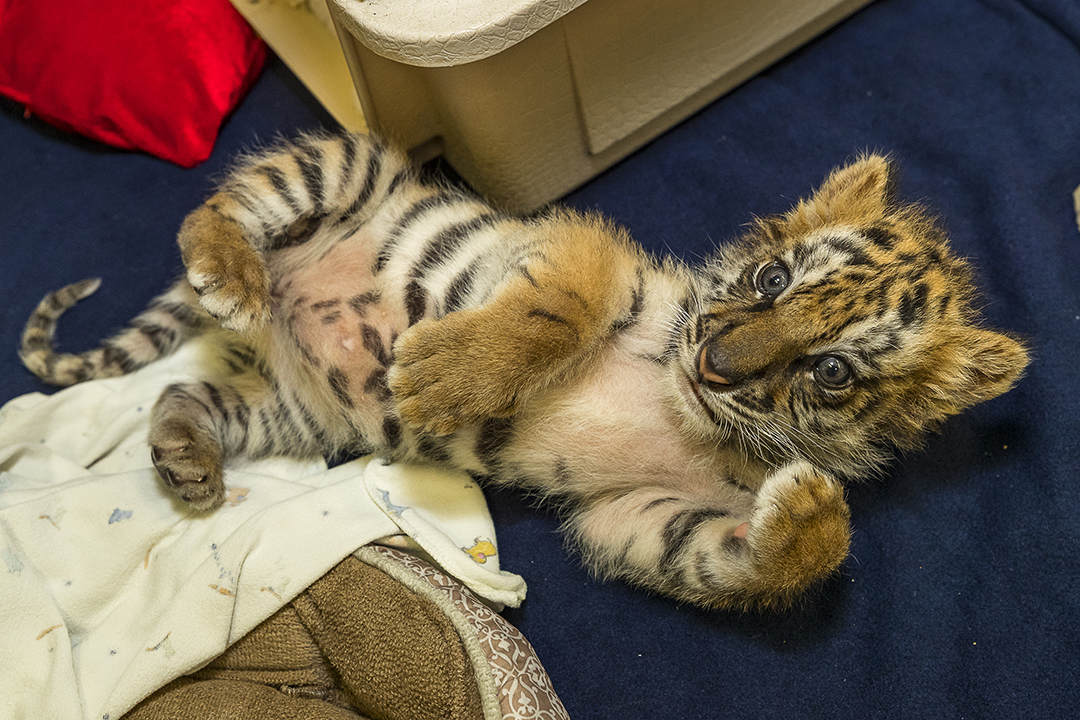
A small male hybrid Bengal tiger cub which was rescued receives a health check at the onsite veterinary hospital.

The park includes the world's largest veterinary hospital. Adjacent to the hospital is the Institute for Conservation Research, which houses the San Diego Zoo's and Safari Park's Frozen Zoo. The park is Southern California's quarantine center for zoo animals imported into the United States through San Diego.

The safari park was a major factor in the recovery of the California condor. Beginning in 1980, it worked with the U.S. Fish and Wildlife Service and the Los Angeles Zoo to start a captive breeding program. The last 22 condors were taken into captivity in 1987. To breed the condors quickly, the Safari Park would remove the eggs from the nests to induce the females to lay a second egg. The removed egg hatches in an incubator and is raised with a condor handpuppet to prevent human imprinting, while the second egg is raised by its parents. The first condor born through this process is Siscouc, a male condor, who was the patriarch of the flock (last chick, Kitwon). Now that title goes to Siwon. Captive-bred condors were reintroduced into the wild beginning in 1992, and today their population 500, with 200 in the wild as of November 2020.

On December 14, 2014, Angalifu, a 44-year-old male northern white rhinoceros, died of old age at the park. This left only five northern white rhinos left in the world, including one female at the Safari Park. On November 22, 2015, the park's last northern white rhino, 41-year-old Nola, was euthanized due to bacterial infection and her health rapidly failing.

In June 2019, two young male African elephants named Ingadze and Lutsandvo were sent to Alabama's Birmingham Zoo as part of the Association of Zoos and Aquariums' Species Survival Plan. On July 28, 2019, the zoo announced the birth of Edward, a male Southern White Rhinoceros, the first rhino in North America born through artificial insemination, born to Victoria and Maoto. The second rhino born through artificial insemination, Future, a female southern White rhinoceros, was also born in the park. On August 12, 2018, the zoo announced the birth of Zuli, a male elephant born to Ndula, the largest calf born at the zoo, of 299 pounds. The record was broken six weeks later by Kaia, a female elephant born to Umngani, at 320 pounds.

== Awards ==
The Safari Park has received several awards for its breeding programs and conservation efforts.

Year	Awarding body	Award	Notes
1972	American Association of Zoological Parks and Aquariums (AAZPA)	Edward H. Bean Award	For hatching of Abyssinian ground hornbill
1974	AAZPA	Edward H. Bean Award	For hatching of Abyssinian ground hornbill
1989	AAZPA	Edward H. Bean Award	For California condor breeding (shared with San Diego Zoo and Los Angeles Zoo)
1994	Association of Zoos and Aquariums (AZA)	Significant Achievement Award	For hornbill breeding program
2007	Avian Scientific Advisory Group (ASAG)	Plume Award for Noteworthy Achievement in Avian Husbandry	For the Light-footed Clapper Rail coalition [shared with Chula Vista Nature Center, SeaWorld San Diego, San Diego Zoo, and United States Fish and Wildlife Service (USFWS) Reserve]
2011	USFWS	Endangered Species Recovery Champion Award (Pacific Southwest Region)	Awarded to Michael Mace, Curator of Birds, for work with California condors and light-footed clapper rails

== Gallery ==
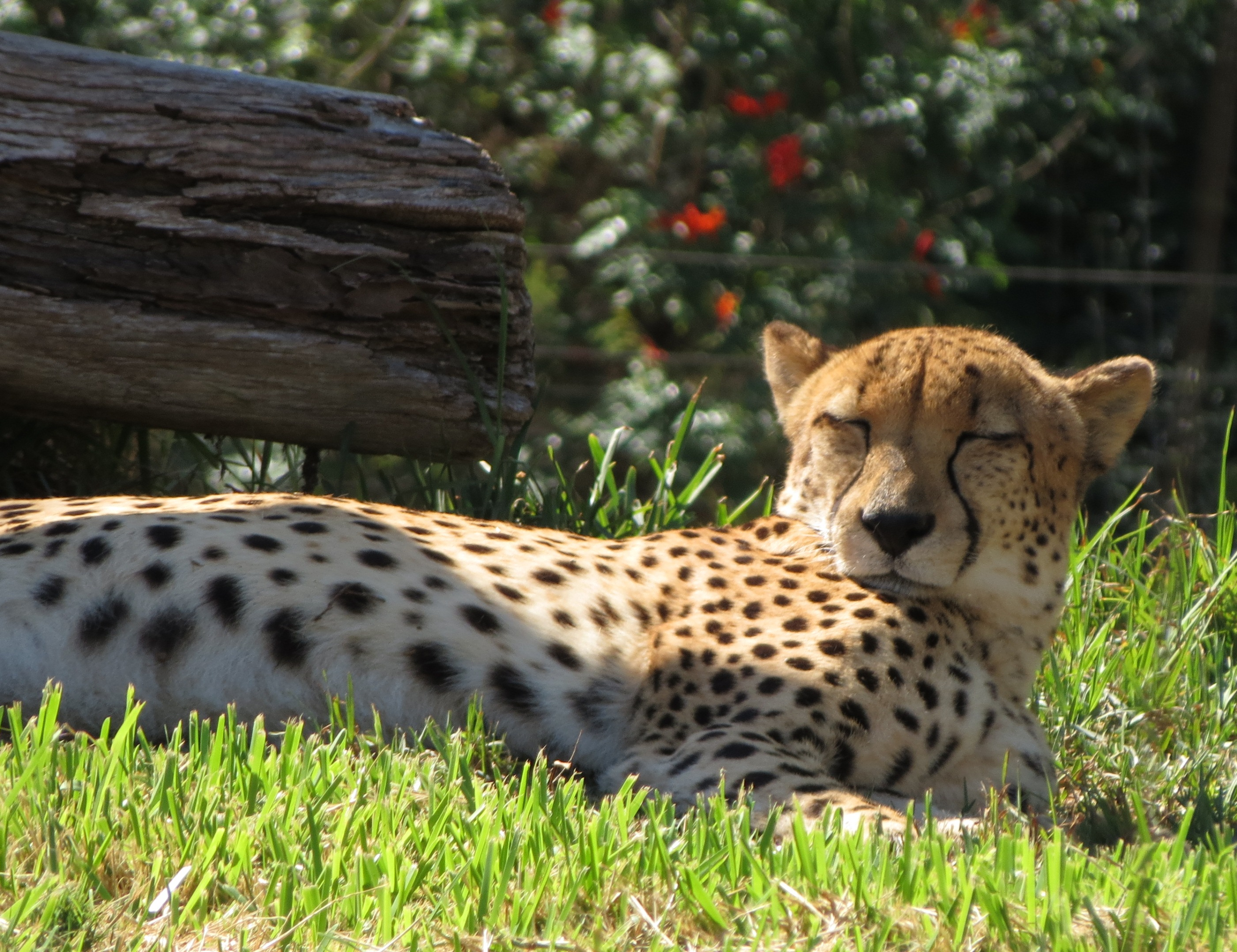
A cheetah at rest.

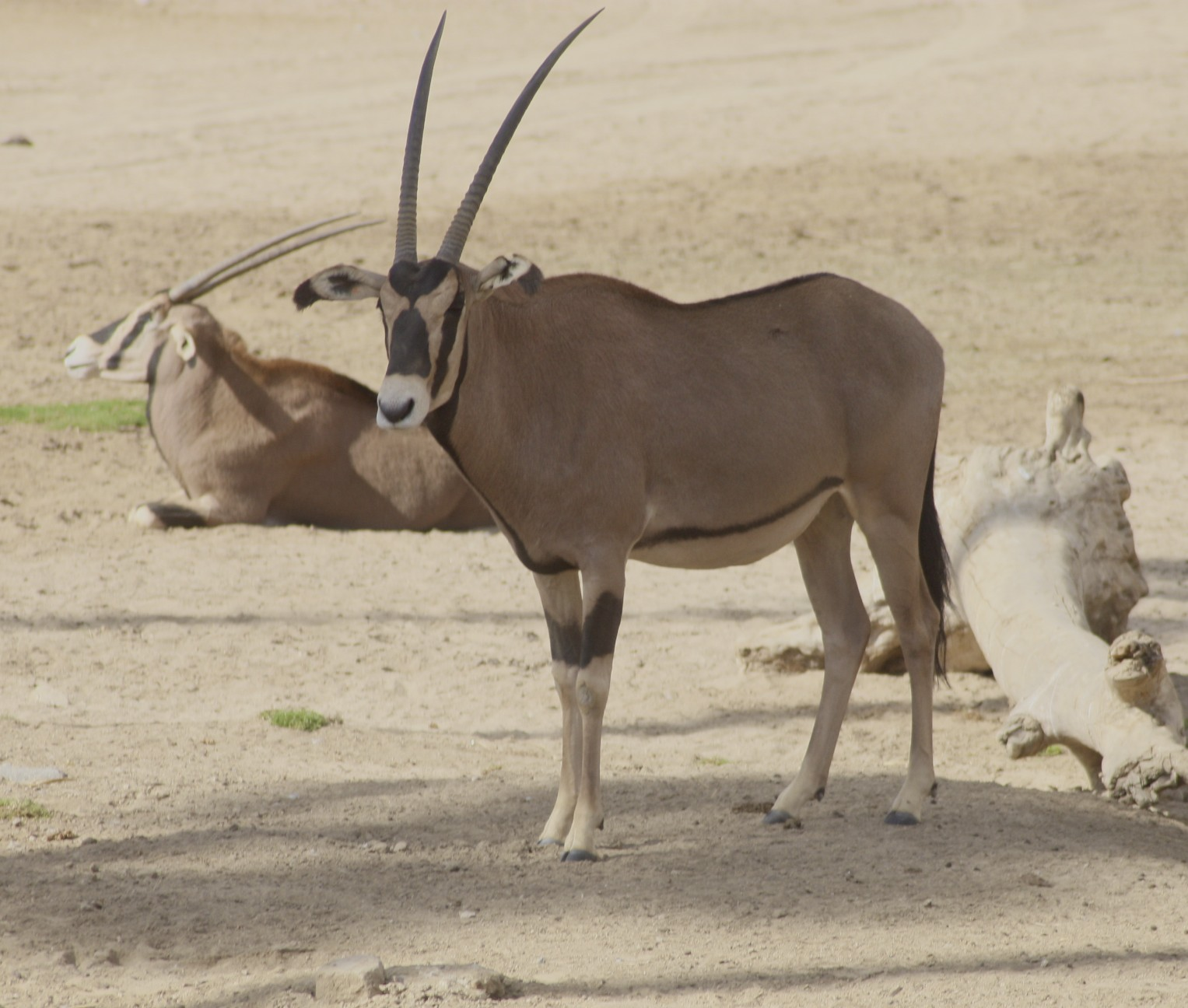
Fringe-eared Oryx.

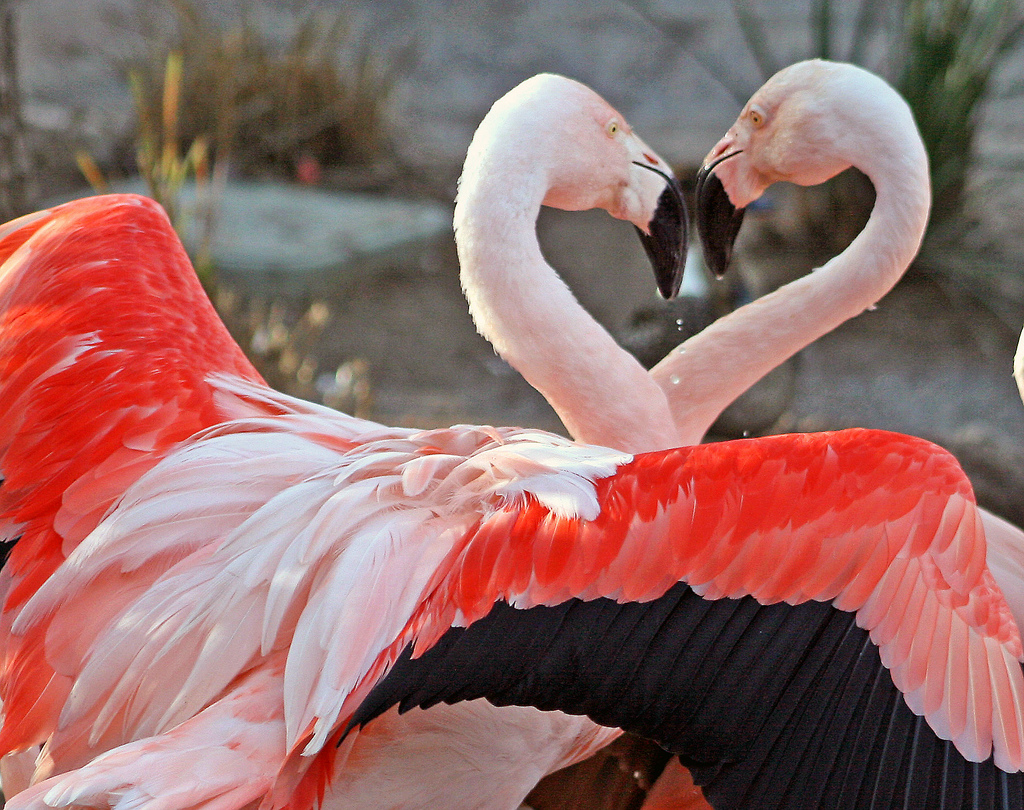
Flamingos.

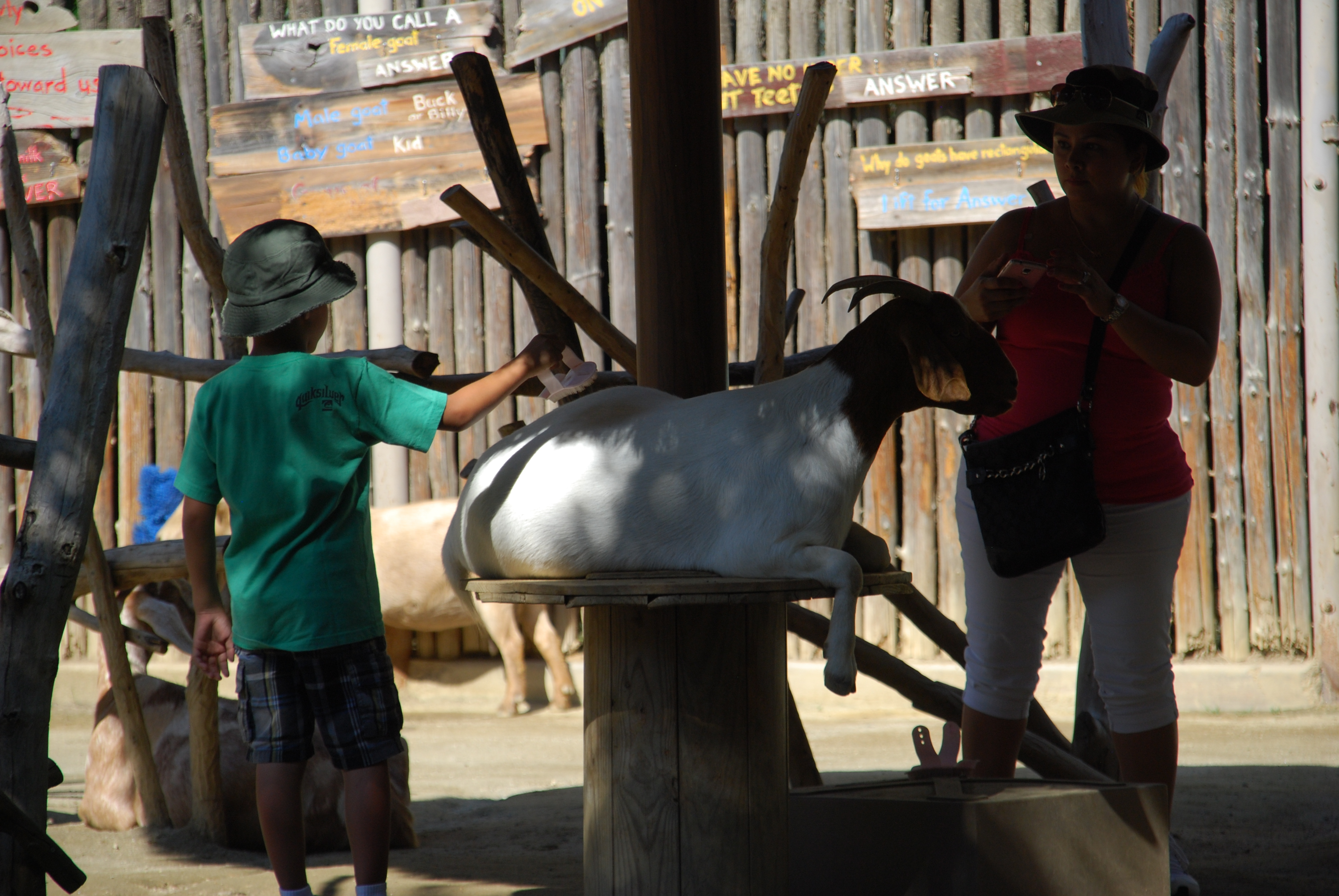
Petting area.

Part of the platypus area.
