= Motokichiro Osaka =

Japanese theologian

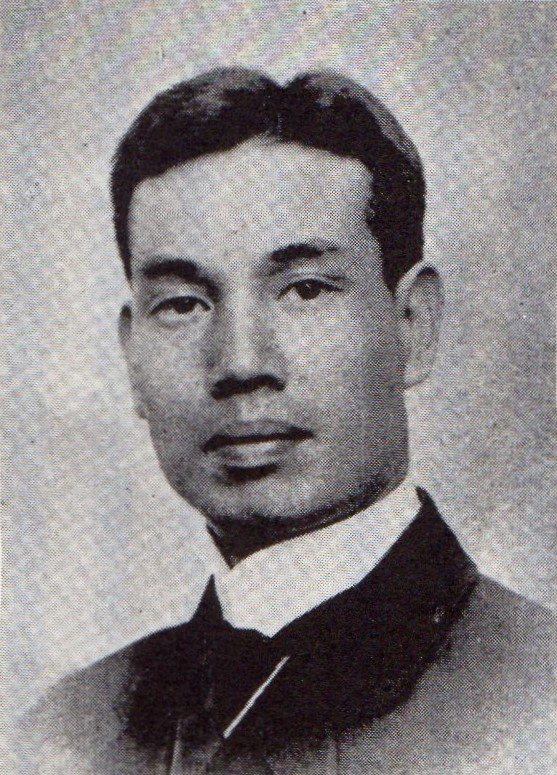
- Born: June 25, 1880; Daijoji-Cho, Ishikawa Prefecture, Japan
- Died: June 10, 1945 (aged 64)
- Occupations: Pastor, Theologian, Columnist, Philosopher
- Spouse: Misao Matsumoto

Motokichiro Osaka (逢坂 元吉郎, Ōsaka Motokichirō; June 25, 1880 – June 10, 1945) was a Japanese pastor, theologian, and newspaper columnist. He is notable for his public criticism of efforts by the Japanese government to regulate religious bodies and strengthen a national form of Shinto, which culminated in a government-backed attack that left Osaka close to death. During his recovery, a personal awakening transformed his conceptualization of Christianity from an earthly, altruistic social practice to an ascetic practice rooted in Catholic orthodoxy.

Osaka was a student and lifelong friend of philosopher Kitaro Nishida, the founder of the Kyoto School.

== Early life and education ==
Osaka was born on June 25, 1880, in Daijoji-cho, Enuma-gun, Ishikawa Prefecture, to Kamayoshi Hiratsuka and his wife Koshiki Momoshi. He was later adopted by the Osaka family.

In 1901, Osaka accompanied his teacher at Ishikawa Prefectural Hirojo Junior High School, Zen philosopher Kitaro Nishida, to a Zen sesshin at a temple in Mikawa.

Nishida inspired Osaka began his studies in the Department of Political Science at Tokyo Imperial University in 1903. He was baptized at the Ichi Bancho Church in Tokyo in 1904 by pastor and theologian Masahisa Uemura and briefly enrolled at Uemura's Tokyo Theological Seminary.

Osaka left Tokyo Imperial University in 1908 over personality conflicts with Uemura to attend Auburn Theological Seminary in New York City. He graduated from Auburn in 1911 and moved to Edinburgh to attend the New College. He returned to Japan in 1912 on a "foreign mission."

== Ministry and Turn Toward Progressive Christianity ==
After his return, Osaka became affiliated with the Japanese Christian Church as a minister in 1913. He was subsequently ordained pastor of the Takanawa Church.

Osaka became critical of what he perceived as indifference by the church toward contemporary social problems. When the Japanese Christian Church fractured in 1917, he left to establish an independent church near Osaki Station in Tokyo. To disseminate his progressive views, he began to publish a magazine entitled The Friend of Faith in the same year. Articles in English and Japanese were both featured in the magazine.

The Osaki church began to operate in 1919.

In 1922, he established a study group called the Messianic Society of the People's Church Study Group to further develop and teach his ideas.

== Yomiuri Newspaper Column and Attack ==
Osaka accepted an invitation to contribute to the Religion Column of the Yomiuri Newspaper from his high school friend, media mogul Matsutarō Shōriki in 1925.

Beginning in 1929, Osaka used his column to criticize the Japanese State's development of policies that sought to centralize control of domestic religious organizations and promote a form of Shinto that scholars have dubbed State Shinto. To strengthen opposition to the Religious Bodies laws of 1927 and 1929, as well as the "Shrine Issue" that sought mandatory participation of Japanese school children in religious ceremonies at imperial shrines, he promoted solidarity between Japanese Christians and Buddhists on the issue. Inter-religious dialogue was considered a prerequisite for establishing a more democratic Japan by many Japanese Christians at the time.

At the behest of philosopher Miki Kiyoshi, another student of Kitaro Nishida, Osaka organized discussions with several intellectuals and philosophers related to the Kyoto School, including Nishida himself. The sessions took place in June and July 1932, and they resulted in texts published in the Yomiuri Newspaper to great public acclaim.

In May 1933, Osaka interviewed his former teacher Nishida to discuss Nazi-sponsored book burnings in Germany. Nishida argued that the "genuine cultural achievements of Germans," which included contributions to "music, theater, and philosophy," could not be destroyed by Nazi cultural politics. Nishida told Osaka that he thought it ironic that both capitalism and communism, the two forces of ideology he considered to be most influential in the epoch, had been birthed by Jewish thinkers David Ricardo and Karl Marx respectively. The interview exemplified Osaka's willingness to publish text critical of the tenets of Japanese ultranationalism.

As Osaka became increasingly vocal in his criticism, the newspaper's conservative management believed that publishing his ideas would "cultivate a feeling of suspicion and animosity toward the politically idealistic and naive" young pastor. In February 1934, Osaka criticized the Shrine System Investigative Committee (Jinja Seido Chosakai), which the Diet had created as an advisory council on the "Shrine Issue," calling it vacuous and challenging what he perceived as its unjust legal protection.

In response to the criticism, leader of the committee Imaizumi Teisuke and his subordinates brought Osaka to the Tokyo Daijingu in the Iidabashi District. Imaizumi's men, who were hired gangsters, forced Osaka to his knees and demanded that he atone for his criticism. When he rejected their demands, they forced him to bow his head while beating him with their fists. Osaka was then taken to the Meiji Shrine in Shibuya, where Imaizumi's men gave him a severe beating.

== Recovery ==
Osaka described his recovery after the attack as "receiving one life for nine deaths." He was hospitalized for nine months and confined to bed for three years. Pleurisy caused by trauma to the ribs led to degeneration of the ribs themselves, which required numerous surgeries and medical care for almost two years after the attack. Ultimately, four of Osaka's ribs were removed. Matsutarō Shōriki paid for Osaka's hospital bills.

While he recovered, Osaka began a correspondence with his old friend philosopher Nishida Kitaro, who had come to visit him in the hospital.

== Transformation and Ascetic Lifestyle ==
According to scholar Thomas Hastings, Osaka came to understand his earlier engagement with Christianity as "excessively conceptual and philosophical." He had spent very little time searching for meaning in the sacrifice of Jesus Christ, as his engagement had been with a Christianity that he understood as an Earthly "philosophical or social movement." He came to see his ordeal as a trial. Osaka concluded that up until the attack, he had lived life "to the detriment of himself and others." His reflection during his recovery prompted him to devote himself entirely to disseminating "the truth of Christianity" and pursuing "an embodied, holistic piety."

After his discharge from the hospital, Osaka attended the Osaki Church. He devoted his time to "reading, prayer, and religious practice" in addition to preaching. According to a member of the church, Osaka switched from reading Kierkagaard to Augustine when he found the former lacking in what he sought. In Augustine's work, he saw parallels to his own life experiences that became so intense that his hands shook while he read. His reading of Augustine led him to seek out works of other early theologians, including the Ante Nicean and Post Nicean Fathers in Tokyo's bookstores.

Osaka came to believe it essential that he "exemplify" a devout life in order to "encourage others." He constructed a small bedchamber for himself connected to the church sanctuary, rising early every morning to spend the day praying and studying. He remained at the church all hours of the day and offered three prayer meetings with members of the church in the morning, afternoon, and evening. He also offered lectures.

Osaka lived this ascetic lifestyle until the turmoil of the Second World War prevented Osaka from continuing.

== Notoriety Outside of Japan ==
In 1939, an anonymous author writing in The Christian Century incorporated the story of Osaka's attack into a critical essay that attacked the silence they perceived among Western Christians around the marginalization of Japanese Christians by the state. He wrote:

"Now came the time when Japanese Christians had to choose between Caesar and God. There was one remarkable Christian minister in Tokyo who chose God. Before him I am ashamed, because I am a coward. Before him the much exalted Kagawa might be ashamed, because it seems that he too is afraid of the Ceasar of Japan. This minister kept on writing and preaching that God was his choice, that God must be recognized by the Japanese nation, that God is still the king of kings, and that Japan shall perish if she does not obey God. In his church and in public places, this man proclaimed all these dangerous things. The Yomiuri Daily News of Tokyo carried some of his messages in its church section.

One day a group of terrorists broke into his study. They beat him until he was unconscious. They forced him to go through a pilgrimage to the shrines of the living and dead deities of the nation as a penitent. They had to drag him along, and they beat him again and again because he refused to bow to any image sacred to Ceasar. I often wonder why he did not give up his ghost. He is crippled for life, but continues to fight his lone battle from his bed. His name, Motokichiro Osaka, should be known to all Christians in the world; yet I have heard no Christian minister mention his name.

If a few influential Christian leaders had supported or joined Osaka, if one Kagawa had spoken one word of approval or sympathy, the majority of the Japanese Christians might have made as brave a showing as the Marxists before them. But not a single man followed in Osaka's steps or openly approved his path. Instead, the whole Christian church in Japan, figuratively speaking, marched to the imperial palace and bowed before the throne!"

== Personal life ==
Osaka married Misao Matsumoto in October 1913.

== Works ==
- The Sacrament (『聖餐論』) (1939)
- Motokichiro Osaka Collection (逢坂元吉郎著作集) (3 volumes) (1971-1972)
- Tenrikyo. One of Japan's New Religions. In: Japan Christian Quarterly, V (Oct. 1930), pp. 363–370.
- An Ascetic Memoir of the Season of Christ's Advent (1938)
- Communion Theory: The Demonstration of the Incarnation Christ (聖餐論 : 受肉のキリストの実証/Seisanron : Juniku no kirisuto no jisshō) (1939)
