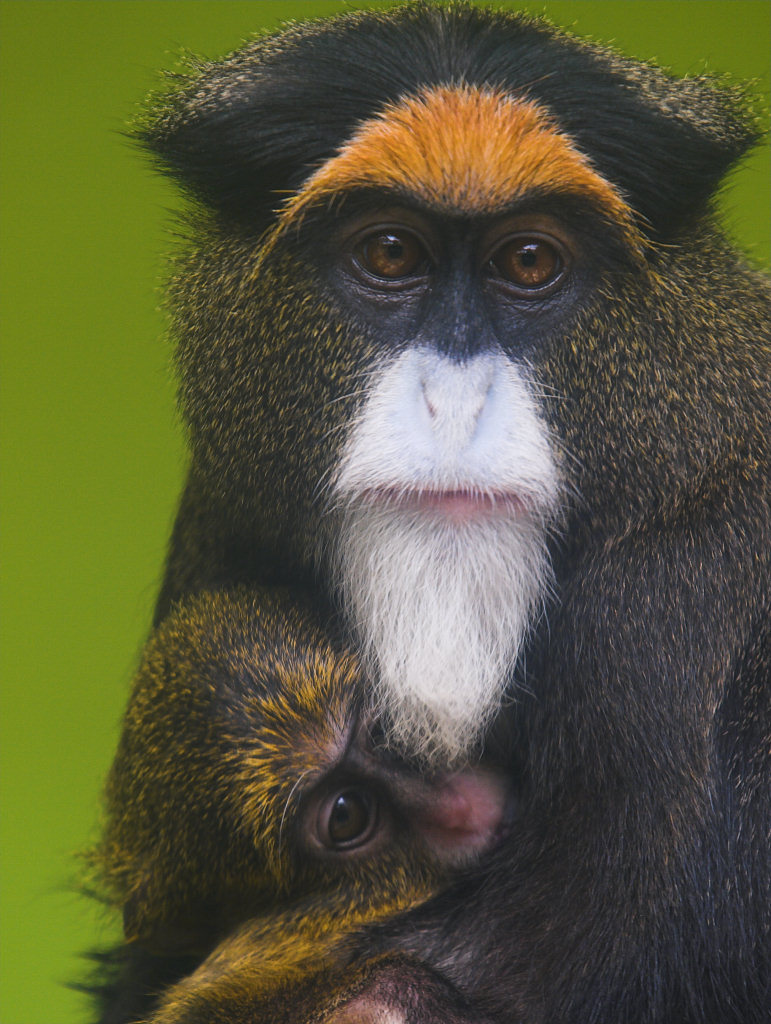

Conservation status
- Least Concern (IUCN 3.1)

Scientific classification
- Kingdom: Animalia
- Phylum: Chordata
- Class: Mammalia
- Order: Primates
- Family: Cercopithecidae
- Genus: Cercopithecus
- Species: C. neglectus

Binomial name
- Cercopithecus neglectus Schlegel, 1876
- Geographic range

= De Brazza's monkey =

Species of Old World monkey

De Brazza's monkey (Cercopithecus neglectus) is an Old World monkey endemic to the riverine and swamp forests of central Africa. The largest species in the guenon family, it is one of the most widespread arboreal African primates. Aside from size, it can be differentiated from other Cercopithecus monkeys by its orange diadem and white beard. Due to its cryptic nature, the species is not well documented in all of its habitats but has shown unique traits, such as pair-bonding and aggressive behavior towards other guenons.

== Etymology ==
Locally known as swamp monkeys, these primates are named after the Italian naturalist and explorer Jacques Savorgnan de Brazza. Their scientific species name, neglectus, which means to pay no attention to, was given to them because of their ability to hide from both humans and predators.

== Description ==
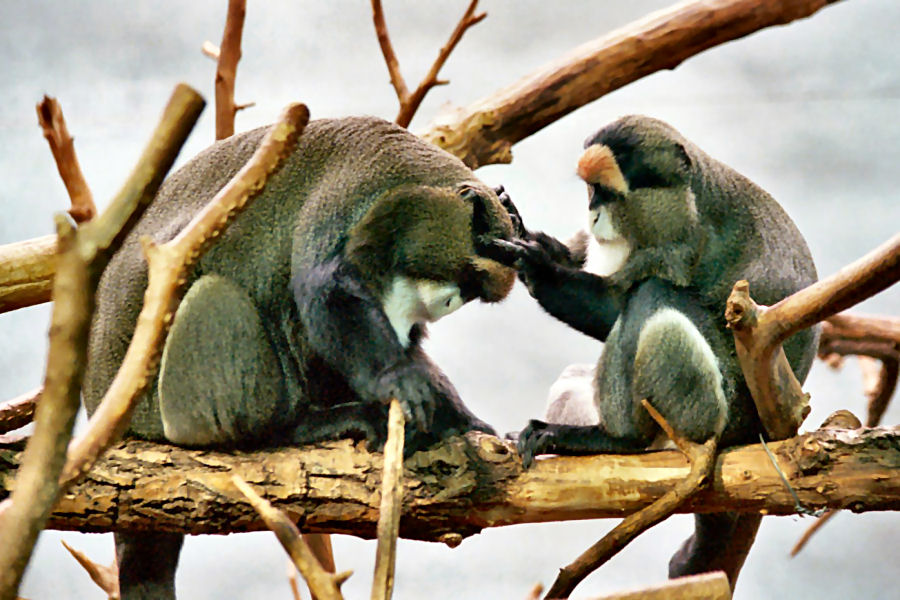
A female De Brazza's monkey grooms a male.

The De Brazza's monkey is the most sexually dimorphic species of guenon; males weigh around 7 kilograms (15 lb), while females weigh around 4 kilograms (8.8 lb). Adults have grey agouti fur with a reddish-brown back, black limbs and tail, and a white rump. Both sexes have cheek pouches they use to carry food while they forage. Males have a distinct blue scrotum, while females have a red perianal region and visible nipples. Juveniles lack the darker colors on the extremities that is characteristic of adults, but retain the white stripes and red rump, while infants are a uniform brown agouti with only a small beard.

The white muzzle and beard, along with an orange crescent on its forehead and white stripes on its thighs distinguish it from other guenons. Due to this distinctive appearance, the monkey is sometimes referred to as the "Ayatollah Monkey" after the similarly-bearded Grand Ayatollah Ruhollah Khomeini.

== Ecology ==
=== Distribution and habitat ===
De Brazza's monkeys range across the swamps, bamboo and dry mountain forests of Angola, Cameroon, Central African Republic, Congo, Democratic Republic of the Congo, Equatorial Guinea, Ethiopia, Gabon, Kenya, South Sudan, Nigeria and Uganda and possibly Tanzania though reports have not been confirmed. Troops are found almost exclusively near water, rarely venturing farther than 1 km (0.62 mi) away from a river or tributary. As a result, they can sometimes be seen swimming. The monkeys prefer dense forest and vegetation, only venturing into more open forest to feed. They are mainly arboreal, but descend to the ground to feed on herbaceous plants. Due to its cryptic nature, there is no accurate population estimate for the species over its entire range.

=== Diet ===
The diet of De Brazza's monkeys consists mostly of herbaceous plants found on the forest floor, and fruits when available. These are supplemented with insects, seeds, and other food sources when primary foods are scarce.

=== Predators ===
Predators of the De Brazza's monkey include the crowned eagle, leopard, humans, and common chimpanzees. Though rare, dogs and Central African rock pythons may also prey on juvenile De Brazza's. The typical predator response is to curl up in a tight ball against the side of a tree with the orange crown and white stripes on the thighs hidden and wait silently for the predator to leave. Individuals will move only if the predator approaches their position, and even then, they move quietly and slowly to try to escape notice.

== Behavior ==
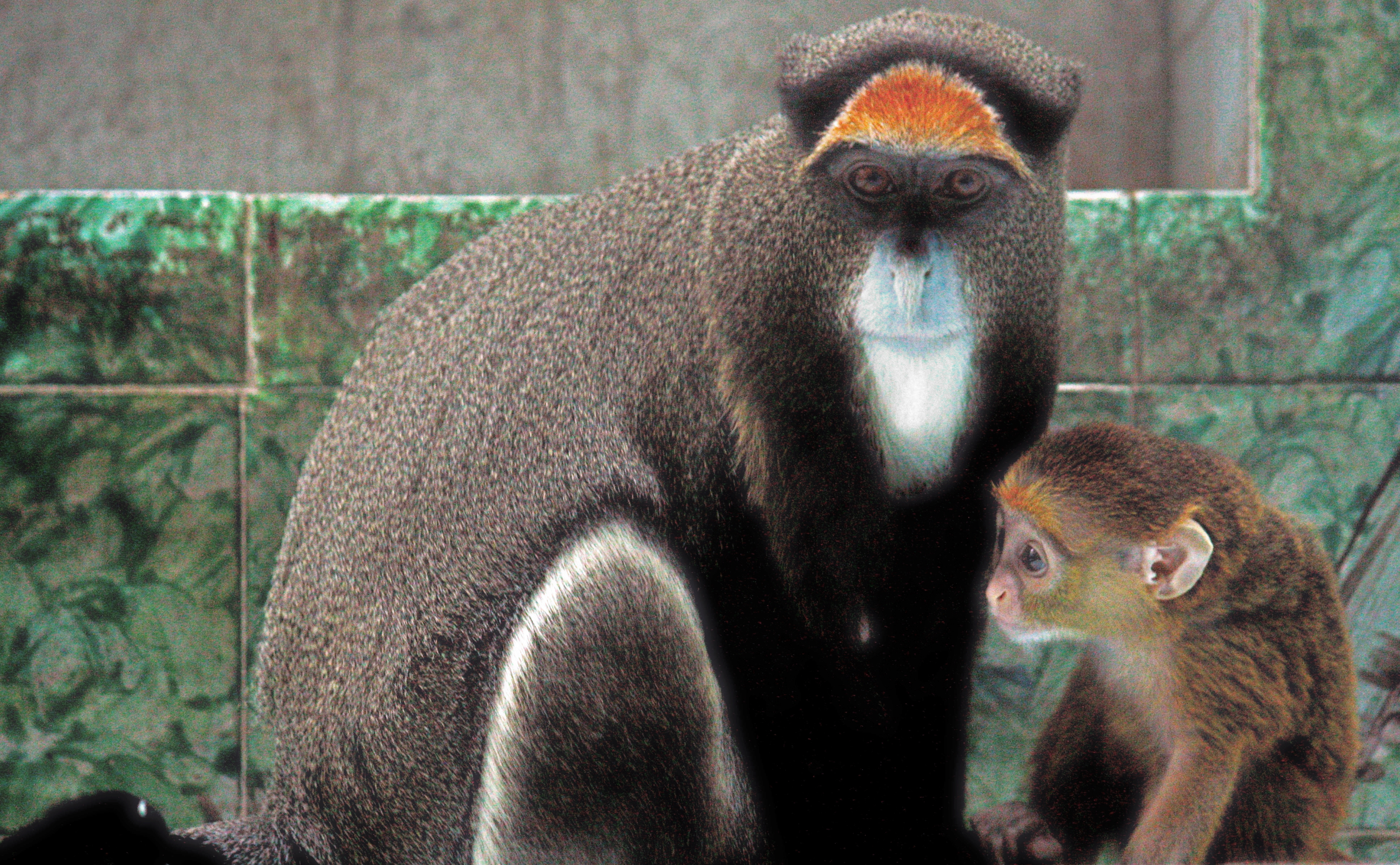
Mother with young

The lifespan of the De Brazza's monkey is thought to correspond similarly to other members of Cercopithecus which live up to 22 years in the wild and 30 years in captivity. Its cryptic nature makes the De Brazza's monkey hard to observe in the wild. Troop sizes are small for a guenon, ranging from two to ten individuals on average. In some areas of Western Africa, such as Gabon and Cameroon, small pair-bonded groups of a male, female, and infants and juveniles have been observed. (These are the only guenons known to exhibit monogamy.) In Eastern Africa, the DeBrazza's monkeys live in single male, multi-female groups. Solitary males do not create bachelor groups and will occasionally depose an alpha male to take over access to the females.

Male De Brazza's monkey communicates with booming sounds. These are usually heard early in the morning when the male calls out to establish his territory, though he will also use this call to bring the group back together if they get separated. When attacked by predators, males will give an alarm call. In the case of crowned eagles, males will emit a short bark before attacking the eagle to scare it off. Females have also been observed to give alarm calls and growl at humans. Otherwise, female vocalizations are limited to quiet croaks given when feeding or resting. Infants and juveniles will give shrill squeals of distress when separated from their mothers or the group. Given the cryptic nature of this species, hearing their calls is sometimes the only way to know they are present. Unlike other guenons, which often form polyspecific associations to decrease predation and increase foraging, DeBrazza's monkeys will be aggressive towards other species and have only been known to tolerate some colobine species that do not compete with them for resources.

=== Reproduction ===
Female De Brazza's monkeys reach sexual maturity around 5 years of age, while males do not reach maturity until closer to 6 years of age. Most juvenile males will leave their natal group before they reach maturity. The breeding season lasts from February to March, but females can also go into estrous during times of high food availability. Gestation lasts between 5 and 6 months, and an infant stays close to its mother for the first year of its life at which point it is weaned. Females usually have one infant at a time, though twins have been born on rare occasions, with a year long inter-birth interval.

== Conservation ==
The De Brazza's monkey is listed as least concern by the IUCN Red List. The main threats to DeBrazza's monkeys are deforestation due to logging and agriculture, and bushmeat hunting. There are several captive populations housed in zoos across Europe and North America. The Association of Zoos and Aquariums (AZA) manages the captive population under a species survival plan. This is unique because the species is not listed as vulnerable or endangered, but has been sponsored by the AZA to proactively prevent need for reactive conservation in the future. More data is needed to fully assess the conservation needs of this species.
