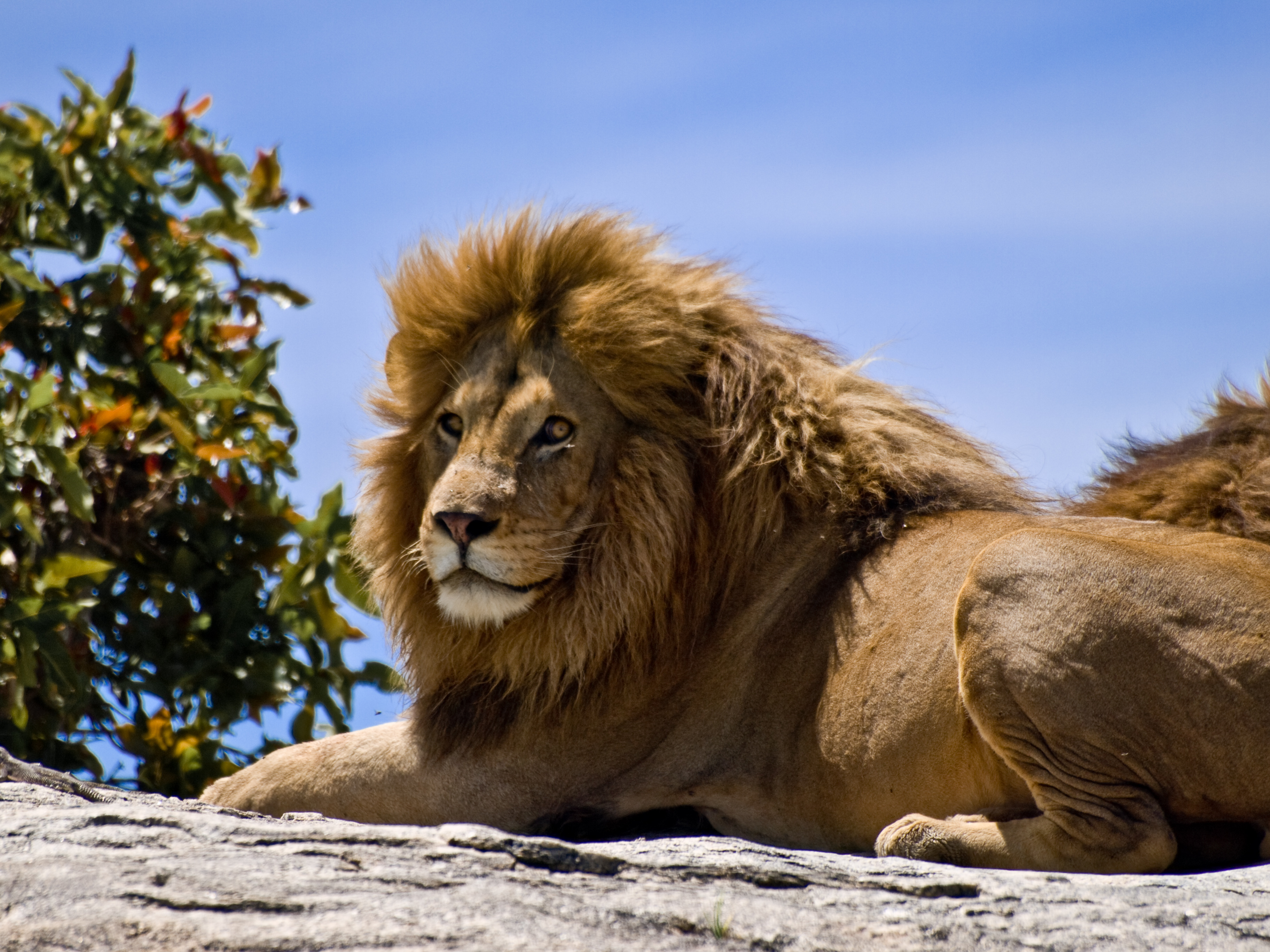
- Male lion in Serengeti National Park, Tanzania
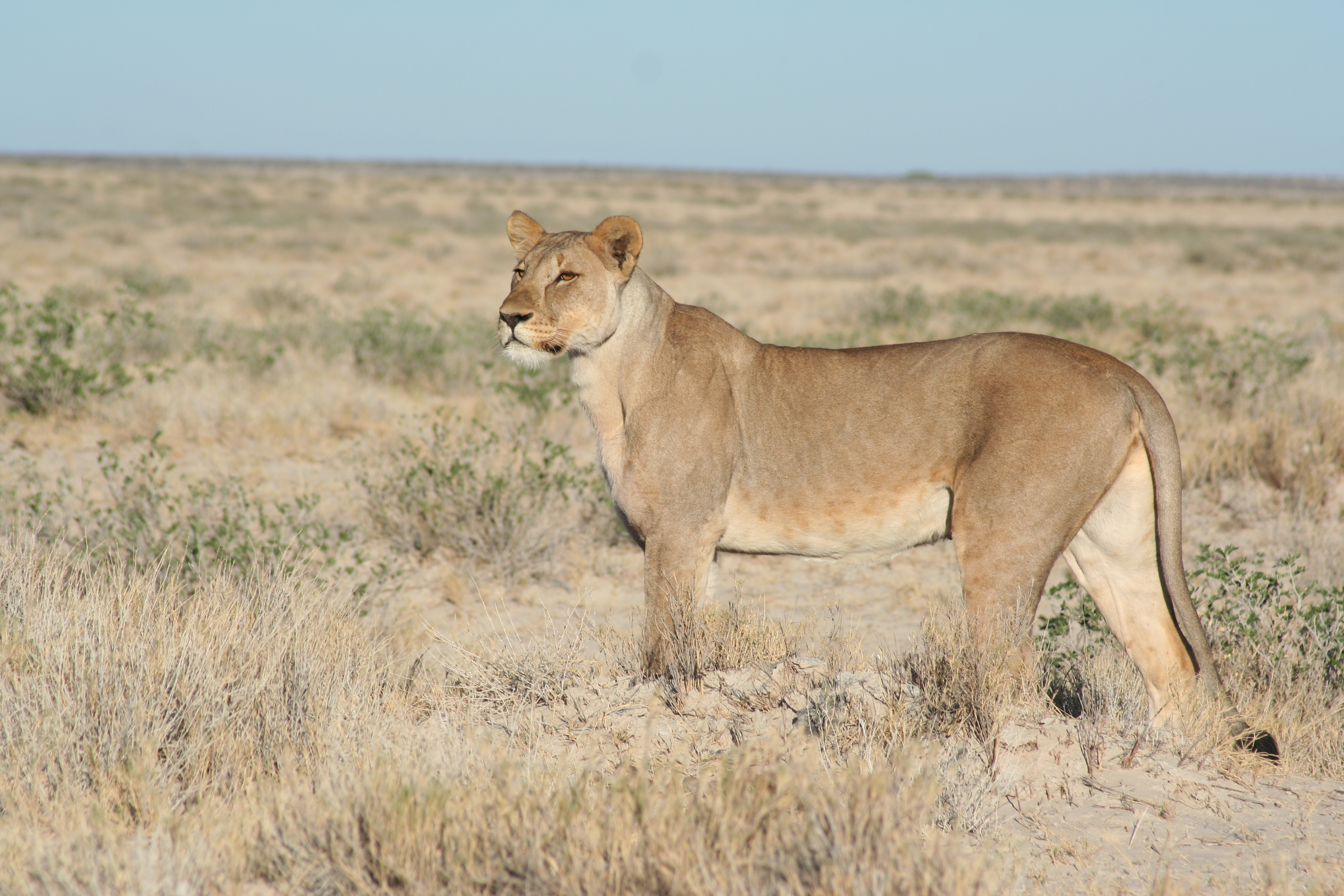
- Lioness in Etosha National Park, Namibia

Conservation status
- Vulnerable (IUCN 3.1)

Scientific classification
- Kingdom: Animalia
- Phylum: Chordata
- Class: Mammalia
- Order: Carnivora
- Family: Felidae
- Genus: Panthera
- Species: P. leo
- Subspecies: P. l. melanochaita

Trinomial name
- Panthera leo melanochaita (Smith, 1842)

Synonyms
- P. l. bleyenberghi; P. l. krugeri; P. l. hollisteri; P. l. massaica; P. l. nyanzae

= Panthera leo melanochaita =

Lion subspecies

Panthera leo melanochaita is a lion subspecies in Southern and East Africa. In this part of Africa, lion populations are regionally extinct in Lesotho, Djibouti and Eritrea, and are threatened by loss of habitat and prey base, killing by local people in retaliation for loss of livestock, and in several countries also by trophy hunting. Since the turn of the 21st century, lion populations in intensively managed protected areas in Botswana, Namibia, South Africa and Zimbabwe have increased, but declined in East African range countries. In 2005, a Lion Conservation Strategy was developed for East and southern Africa.

Results of a phylogeographic study indicate that lion populations in southern and eastern Africa form a major clade distinct from lion populations in West Africa, Central Africa and Asia. In 2017, the Cat Classification Task Force of the IUCN Cat Specialist Group subsumed lion populations according to the major clades into two subspecies, namely P. l. leo and P. l. melanochaita. Within P. l. melanochaita three subclades are clearly distinguishable. One from northeastern Africa, another one from southwestern Africa and a third one from southeastern Africa.

The type specimen for P. l. melanochaita was a black-maned lion from the Cape of Good Hope, known as the Cape lion. Phylogeographic analysis of lion samples from Gabon and the Republic of the Congo indicate their close genetic relation to P. l. melanochaita samples from Namibia and Botswana. It has been referred to as the Southern lion, Southern African lion, East-Southern African lion and the "southern subspecies".

== Taxonomy ==
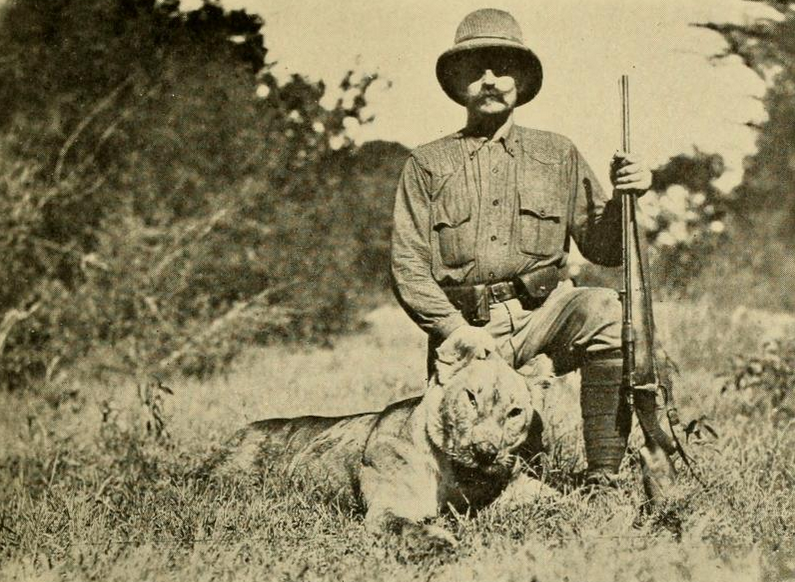
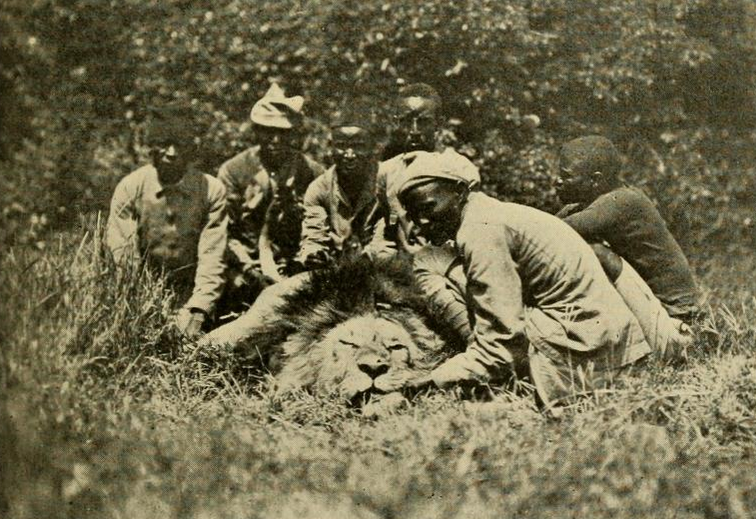
Lions shot in Kenya's Sotik Plains in 1909

Felis (Leo) melanochaitus was the scientific name proposed by Charles Hamilton Smith in 1842 who described a lion specimen from South Africa's Cape Province. In the 19th and 20th centuries, several naturalists described zoological specimens from Southern and East Africa and proposed the following subspecies:

- Felis leo somaliensis (Noack 1891), based on two lion specimens from Somalia
- Felis leo massaicus (Neumann 1900), based on two lions killed near Kibaya and the Gurui River in Kenya
- Felis leo sabakiensis (Lönnberg 1910), based on two male lions from the environs of Mount Kilimanjaro
- Felis leo roosevelti (Heller 1913), a lion from the Ethiopian Highlands presented to Theodore Roosevelt
- Felis leo nyanzae (Heller 1913), a lion skin from Kampala, Uganda
- Felis leo bleyenberghi (Lönnberg 1914), a male lion from the Katanga Province of Belgian Congo
- Leo leo hollisteri (Joel Asaph Allen 1924), a male lion from the area of Lime Springs, Sotik on the eastern shore of Lake Victoria
- Leo leo krugeri (Austin Roberts 1929), an adult male lion from the Sabi Sand Game Reserve named in honour of Paul Kruger
- Leo leo vernayi (Roberts 1948), a male lion from the Kalahari collected by the Vernay-Lang Kalahari Expedition
- Panthera leo webbensies Ludwig Zukowsky 1964, two lions from Somalia, one in the Natural History Museum, Vienna that originated in Webi Shabeelle, the other kept in a German zoo that had been imported from the hinterland of Mogadishu.

Dispute over the validity of these purported subspecies continued among naturalists and curators of natural history museums until the early 21st century. In the 20th century, some authors supported the view of the Cape lion being a distinct subspecies. In 1939, the American zoologist Allen also recognized F. l. bleyenberghi, F. l. krugeri and F. l. vernayi as valid subspecies in Southern Africa, and F. l. hollisteri, F. l. nyanzae and F. l. massaica as valid subspecies in East Africa.

Pocock subordinated the lion to the genus Panthera in 1930, when he wrote about Asiatic lions. Ellerman and Morrison-Scott recognized only two lion subspecies in the Palearctic realm, namely the African P. l. leo and the Asiatic P. l. persica. Various authors recognized between seven and 10 African lion subspecies. Others followed the classification proposed by Ellerman and Morrison-Scott, recognizing two subspecies including one in Africa.

In the 1970s, the scientific name P. l. vernayi was considered synonymous with P. l. krugeri. In 1975, Vratislav Mazák hypothesized that the Cape lion evolved geographically isolated from other populations by the Great Escarpment. In the early 21st century, Mazák's hypothesis about a geographically isolated evolution of the Cape lion was challenged. Genetic exchanges between populations in the Cape, Kalahari and Transvaal Province regions and farther east are considered having been possible through a corridor between the Great Escarpment and the Indian Ocean.

In 2005, the authors of Mammal Species of the World recognized P. l. bleyenberghi, P. l. krugeri, P. l. vernayi, P. l. massaica, P. l. hollisteri and P. l. nyanzae as valid taxa. In 2016, IUCN Red List assessors subsumed all African lion populations to P. l. leo. Two lion subspecies are now recognised:

- P. l. melanochaita is understood as comprising lion populations in the contemporary Southern and East African range countries,
- P. l. leo comprises lion populations in North, West and Central Africa and Asia.

Genome-wide data of a wild-born historical lion sample from Sudan clustered with P. l. leo in mtDNA-based phylogenies, but with a high affinity to P. l. melanochaita. This result indicates that the taxonomic position of lions in Central Africa may require revision.

=== Phylogeny ===
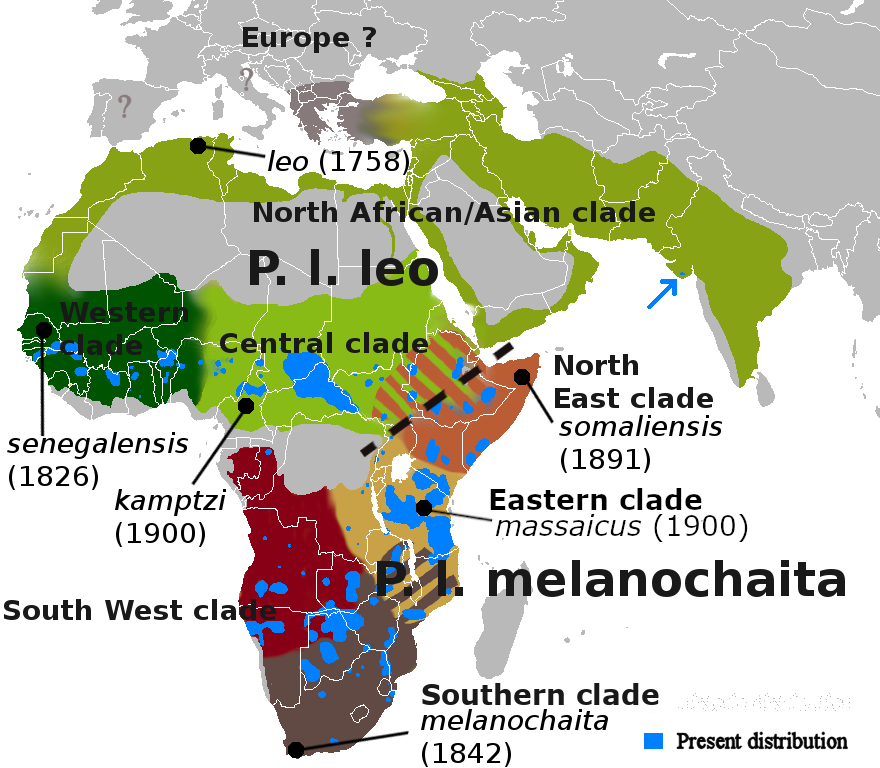
Range map including proposed clades and the two subspecies (P. l. leo and P. l. melanochaita) according to genetic research

Since the beginning of the 21st century, several phylogenetic studies were conducted to aid clarifying the taxonomic status of lion samples kept in museums and collected in the wild. Scientists analysed between 32 and 480 lion samples from up to 22 countries. Results of genetic analyses indicate that the species comprises two main evolutionary groups, one in Southern and East Africa, and the other in the northern and eastern parts of its historical range. These groups genetically diverged between 50,000 and 200,000 years ago. It was assumed that tropical rainforest and the East African Rift constituted major barriers between the two groups.

Lion samples from Gabon's Batéké Plateau National Park and Odzala-Kokoua National Park in Republic of the Congo were found to be genetically closely related to lion samples from Namibia and Botswana. A phylogenetic analysis of lion samples from Africa and Asia showed that they shared a common ancestor probably between 98,000 and 52,000 years ago. Samples from West Africa shared alleles with samples from Southern Africa, and samples from Central Africa shared alleles with samples from Asia. This indicates that Central Africa was a melting pot of lion populations after they had become isolated. They possibly migrated through corridors in the Nile Basin during the early Holocene.

=== Overlap between subspecies ===
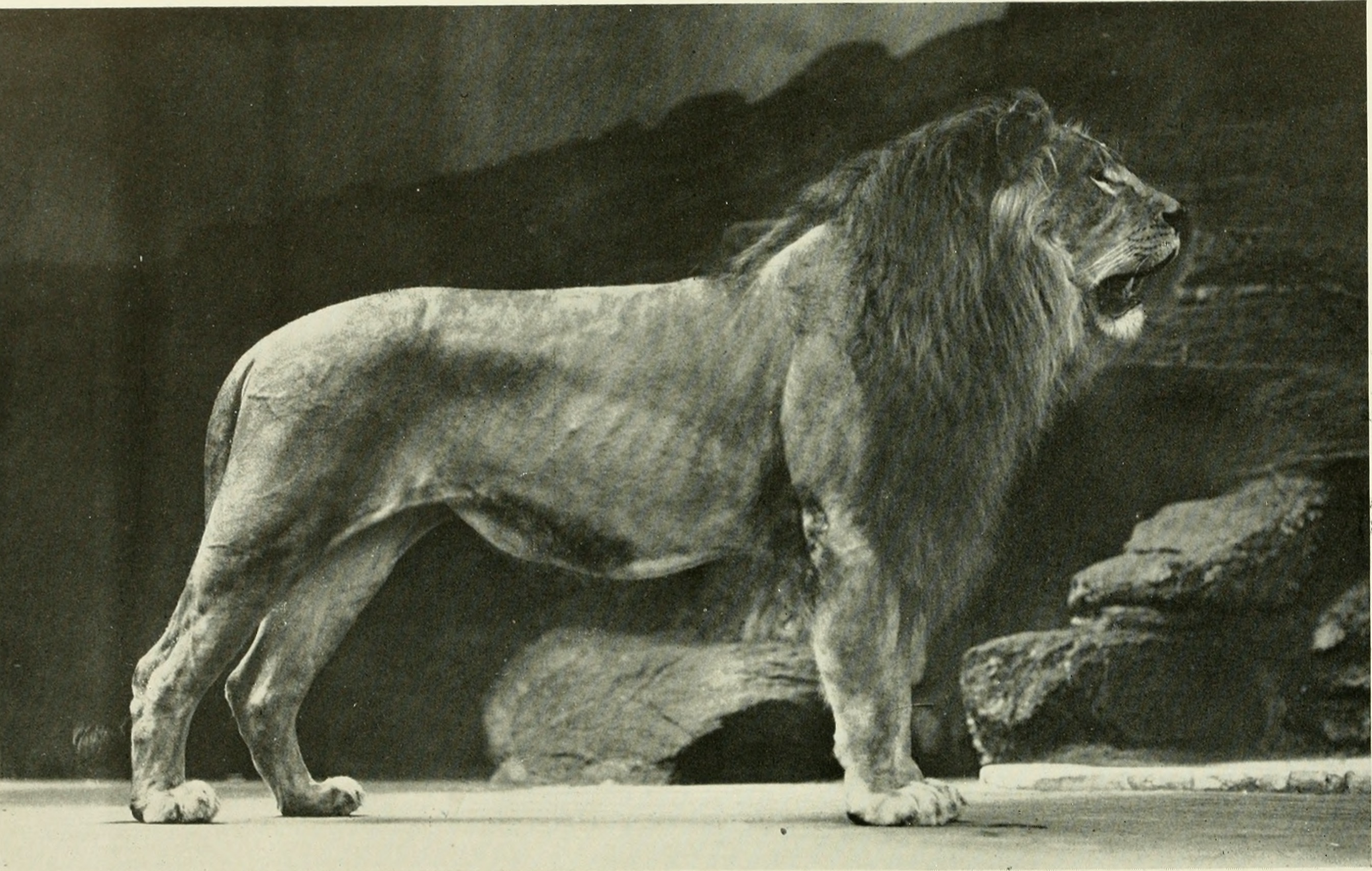
Lion from Ethiopia at Bronx Zoo

Among six samples of captive lions from Ethiopia, five clustered with samples from East Africa, but one with samples from the Sahel. For a subsequent phylogeographic study, eight wild lion samples from the Ethiopian Highlands were included in the DNA sequencing analysis using 194 lion samples from 22 countries. Four of these samples clustered with samples from Central Africa, and four with samples from East Africa, indicating that the Great Rift Valley, Ethiopia was not a complete barrier to gene flow. Southeastern Ethiopia is therefore considered a genetic admixture zone between Central and East African lions.

== Distribution and habitat ==
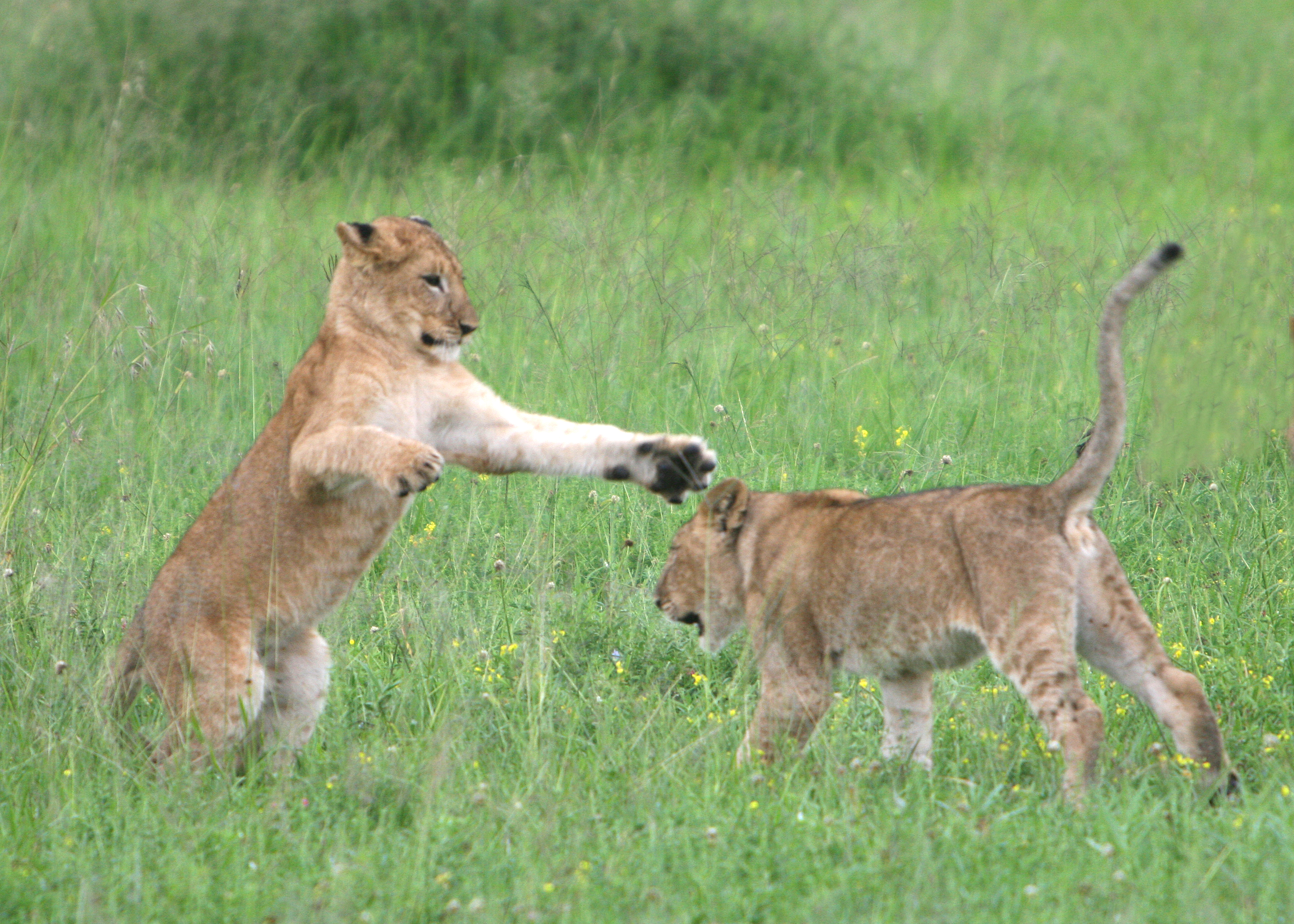
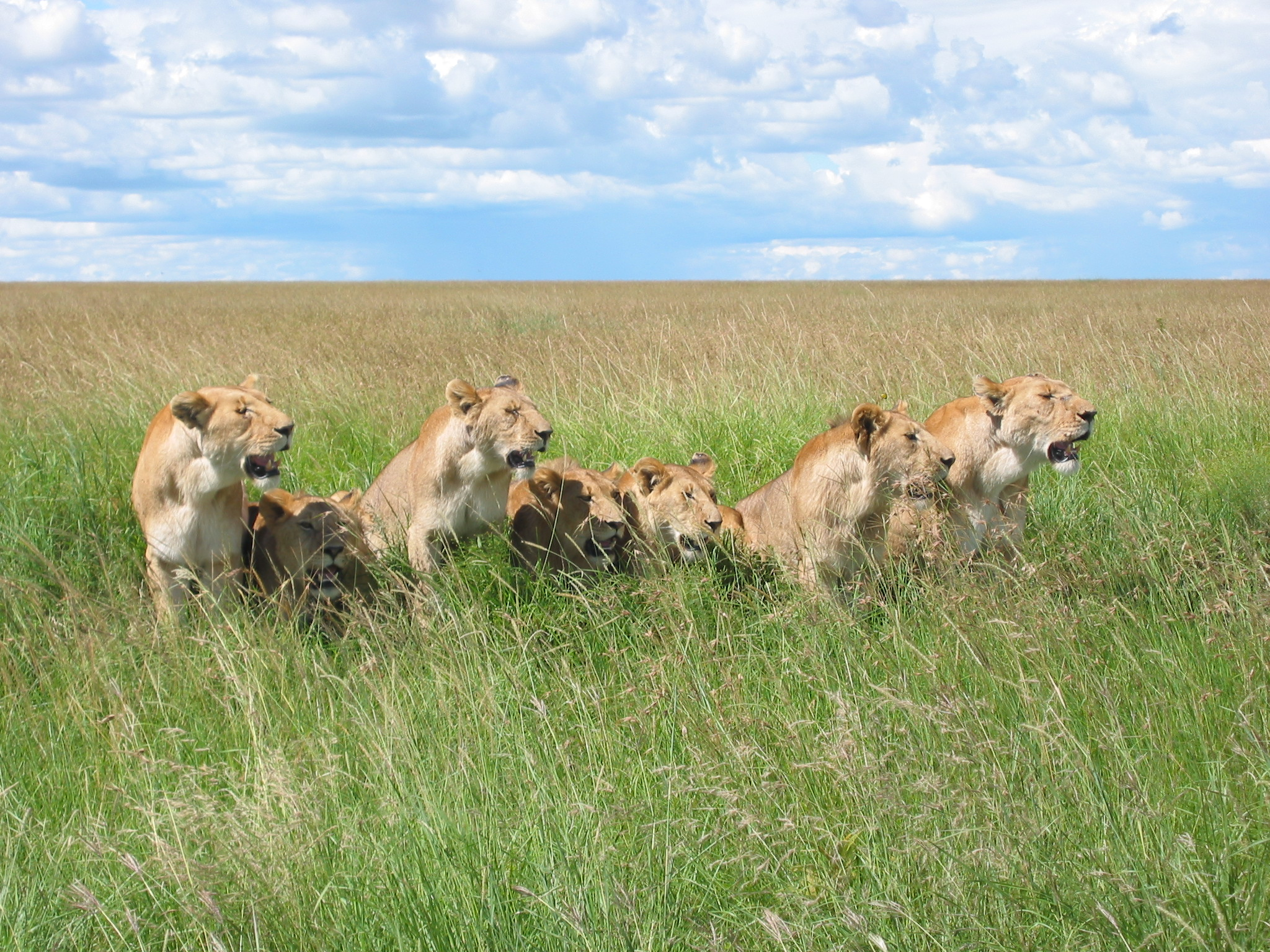
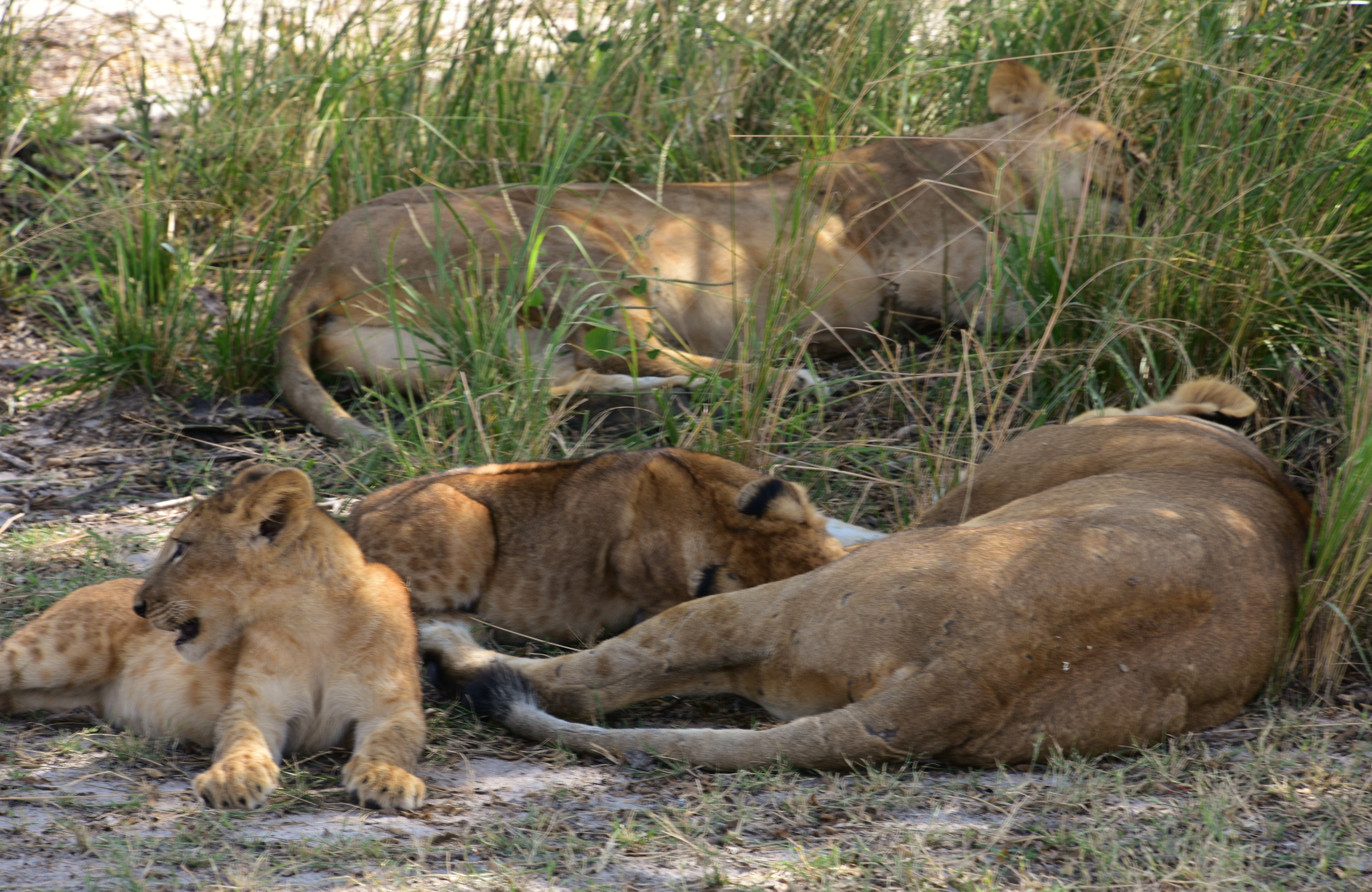
The Serengeti and Maasai Mara National Parks and Selous Game Reserve are lion strongholds in East Africa with stable lion populations

In East and Southern Africa, lion populations declined in:

- In Ethiopia, where lion populations declined since at least the early 20th century due to trophy hunting by Europeans, killing of lions by local people out of fear, for illegal sale of skins and during civil wars. As of 2009, between seven and 23 lions were estimated to live in Nechisar National Park located in the Ethiopian Highlands. This small protected area is encroached by local people and their livestock. In 2012, lions were documented in cloud forest habitat of Kafa Biosphere Reserve.
- Somalia since the early 20th century. Intensive poaching since the 1980s and civil unrest posed a threat to lion persistence.
- Uganda to near extinction in the 20th century. In 2010, the lion population in Uganda was estimated at 408 ± 46 individuals in three protected areas including Queen Elizabeth, Murchison Falls and Kidepo Valley National Parks. Other protected areas in the country probably host less than 10 lions. Lions in Queen Elizabeth National Park form a contiguous population with lions in Virunga National Park.
- Kenya in the 1990s due to poisoning of lions and poaching of lion prey species. At least 108 lions were killed between 2001 and 2006 in the Amboseli−Tsavo West−Tsavo East National Park network. As of 2006, there were an estimated 675 lions in the Tsavo national parks, out of the 2,000 total in Kenya. Between 2004 and 2013, lion guardians around Amboseli National Park identified 65 lions in an area of 3,684 km^{2} (1,422 sq mi). Lion populations in Kenya and Tanzania are fragmented over 17 patches ranging in size from 86 to 127,515 km^{2} (33 to 49,234 sq mi).
- Rwanda and Tanzania due to killing of lions during the Rwandan Civil War and ensuing refugee crisis in the 1990s. A small population was present in Rwanda's Akagera National Park, estimated at 35 individuals at most in 2004. Lions were reintroduced to this national park in 2015.
- Malawi and Zambia due to illegal hunting of prey species in protected areas.
- Botswana due to intensive hunting and conversion of natural habitats for settlements since the early 19th century. In Northern Tuli Game Reserve, 19 lions died between 2005 and 2011 due to poaching, trophy hunting and snaring.
- Namibia due to massive killing of lions by farmers since at least the 1970s. In 2010, the small and isolated lion population in the Kalahari was estimated at 683 to 1,397 individuals in three protected areas, the Kgalagadi Transfrontier Park, the Kalahari Gemsbok and Gemsbok National Parks.
- South Africa since the early 19th century in the Natal and Cape Provinces south of the Orange River, where the Cape lion population was eradicated by 1860. A few decades later, lions in the Highveld north of the Orange River were also eradicated. In Transvaal, lions occurred historically in the Highveld as well, but were restricted to eastern Transvaal's Bushveld by the 1970s. Between 2000 and 2004, 34 lions were reintroduced to eight protected areas in the Eastern Cape Province, including Addo Elephant National Park. In Venetia Limpopo Nature Reserve, 18 lions were trophy hunted and 11 euthanized between 2005 and 2011.

Contemporary lion distribution and habitat quality in East and Southern Africa was assessed in 2005, and Lion Conservation Units (LCU) mapped. Between 2002 and 2012, educated guesses for size of populations in these LCUs ranged from 33,967 to 32,000 individuals. The LCUs Ruaha−Rungwa, Serengeti−Mara, Tsavo−Mkomazi and Selous in East Africa, as well as Luangwa, Kgalagadi, Okavango−Hwange, Mid−Zambezi, Niassa and Greater Limpopo in Southern Africa are currently considered lion strongholds. These LCUs host more than 500 individuals each, and the population trend is stable there as of 2012.

=== North East African clade ===
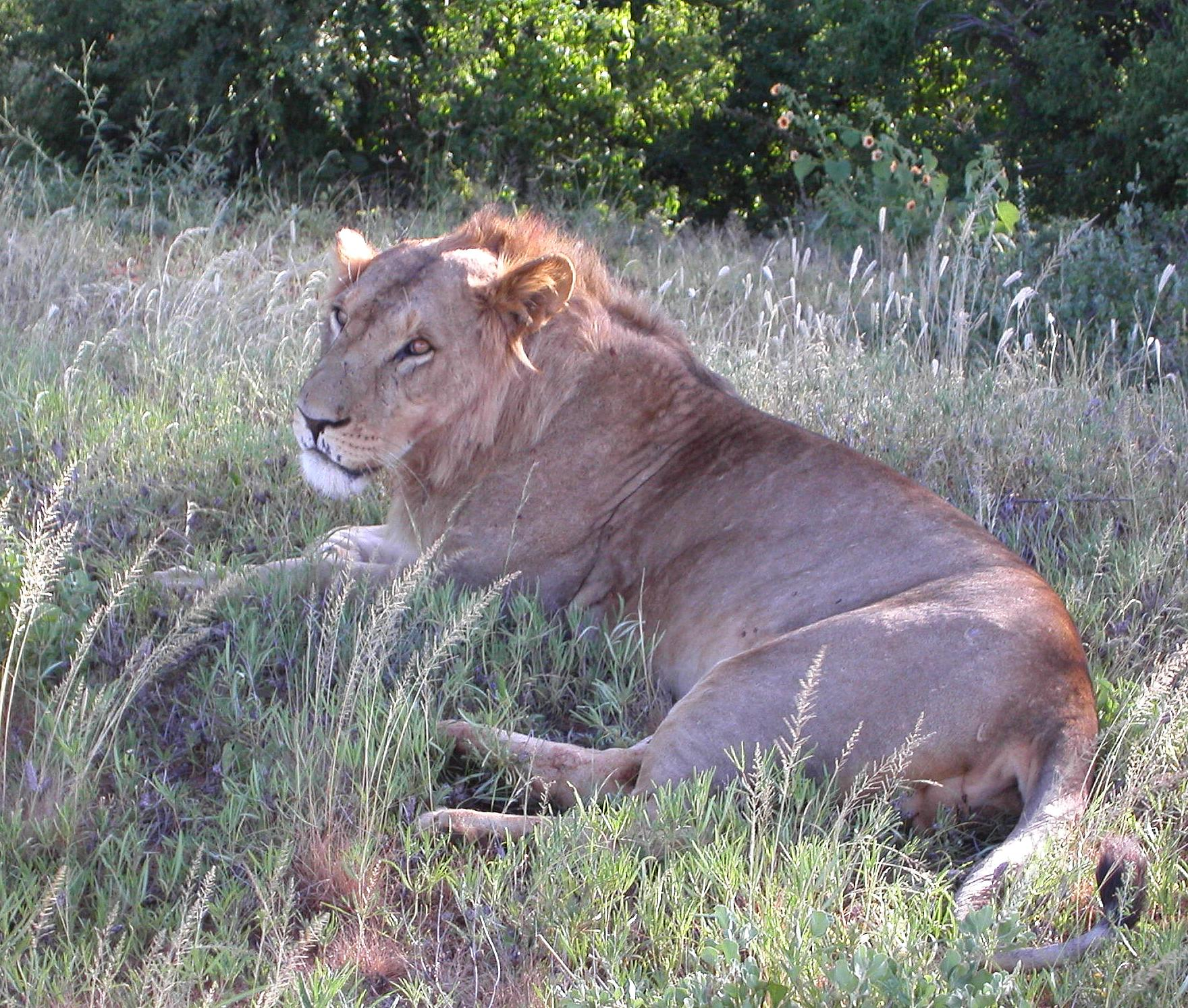
A juvenile male from the northeastern clade at Samburu

Lions, which can be grouped into the northeastern clade are found in Somalia, Northern Kenya and Ethiopia, with a larger hybridization zone to the Northern lion subspecies (P. l. leo) in Ethiopia.

Range countries	Lion Conservation Units	Area in km^{2}
Ethiopia	South Omo, Nechisar, Bale, Welmel-Genale, Awash National Parks, Ogaden	93,274
Somalia	Arboweerow−Alafuuto	24,527
Somalia, Kenya	Bushbush−Arawale	22,540
Kenya	Laikipia−Samburu, Meru and Nairobi National Parks	43,706

=== South East African clade ===
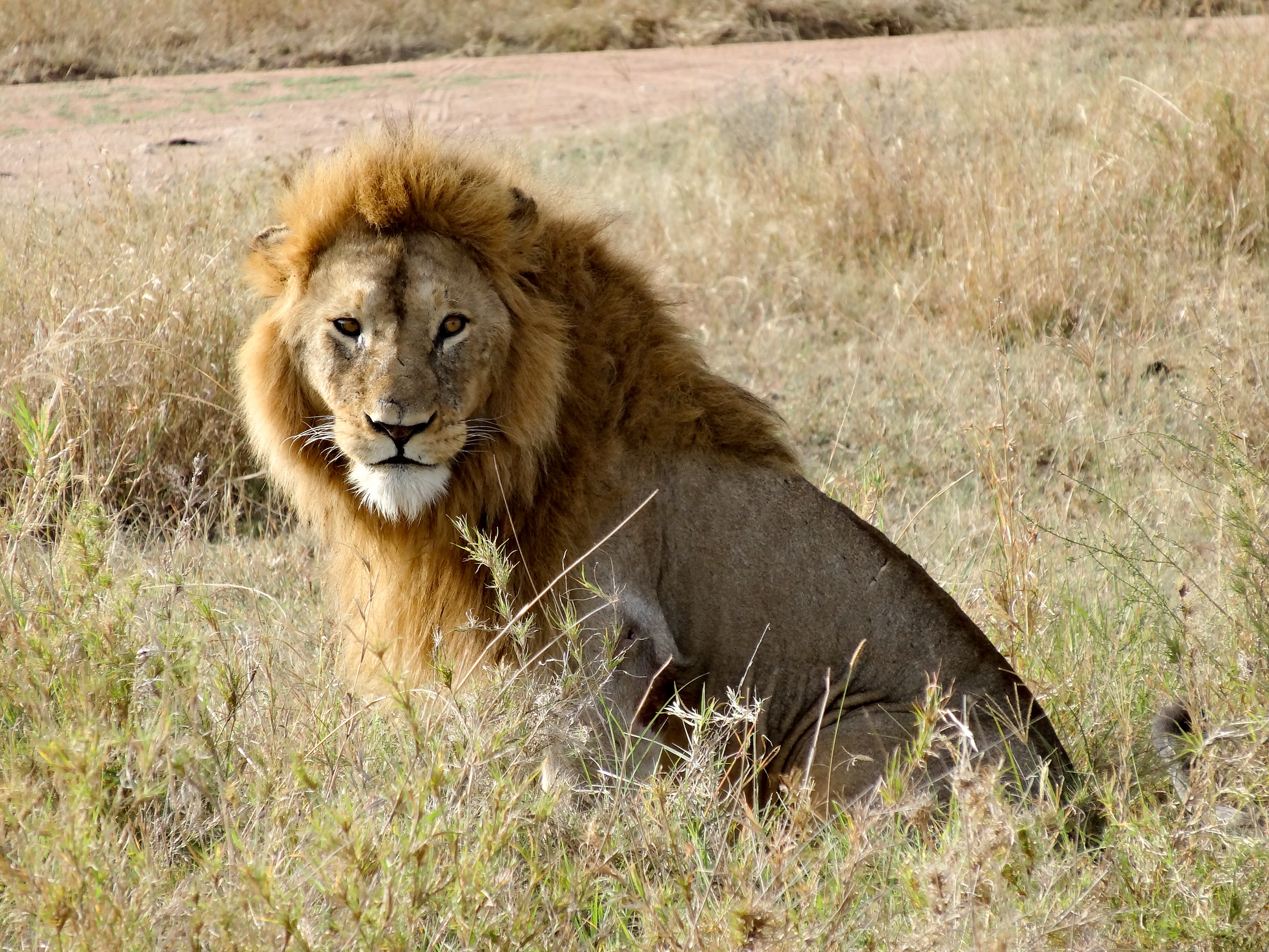
A lion male from the southeastern clade in the Serengeti

Lions, which can be grouped into the southeastern clade are found in Southern Kenya, Western DRC, Tanzania, Mozambique, Malawi, Zambia, southern Namibia and South Africa, with a larger hybridization zone to the southwestern lion clade in the Kruger National Park area (Great Limpopo Transfrontier Park). The classification of lions in Uganda is not clarified, since there were no samples included in the most comprehensive recent study.

Range countries	Lion Conservation Units	Area in km^{2}
Uganda	Murchison Falls, Toro−Semulik, Lake Mburo	4,800
Democratic Republic of Congo	Itombwe Nature Reserve, Luama	8,441
Democratic Republic of Congo, Uganda	Queen Elizabeth−Virunga National Parks	5,583
Kenya, Tanzania	Serengeti−Mara, Tarangire and Tsavo−Mkomazi	75,068
Tanzania	Dar-Biharamulo, Ruaha−Rungwa, Mpanga-Kipengere, Wami Mbiki−Saadani, Selous	384,489
Tanzania, Mozambique	Niassa	177,559
Mozambique	Cahora Bassa, Gilé, Gorongosa−Marromeu	82,715
Mozambique, Zambia	Middle Zambezi	64,672
Mozambique, South Africa	Great Limpopo Transfrontier Park	150,347
Zambia	Liuwa Plains, Sioma Ngwezi, Kafue Sumbu Complex	72,569
Zambia, Malawi	North−South Luangwa	72,992
Malawi	Kasungu, Nkhotakota	4,187
Botswana, South Africa	Kgalagadi	163,329

=== South West African clade ===
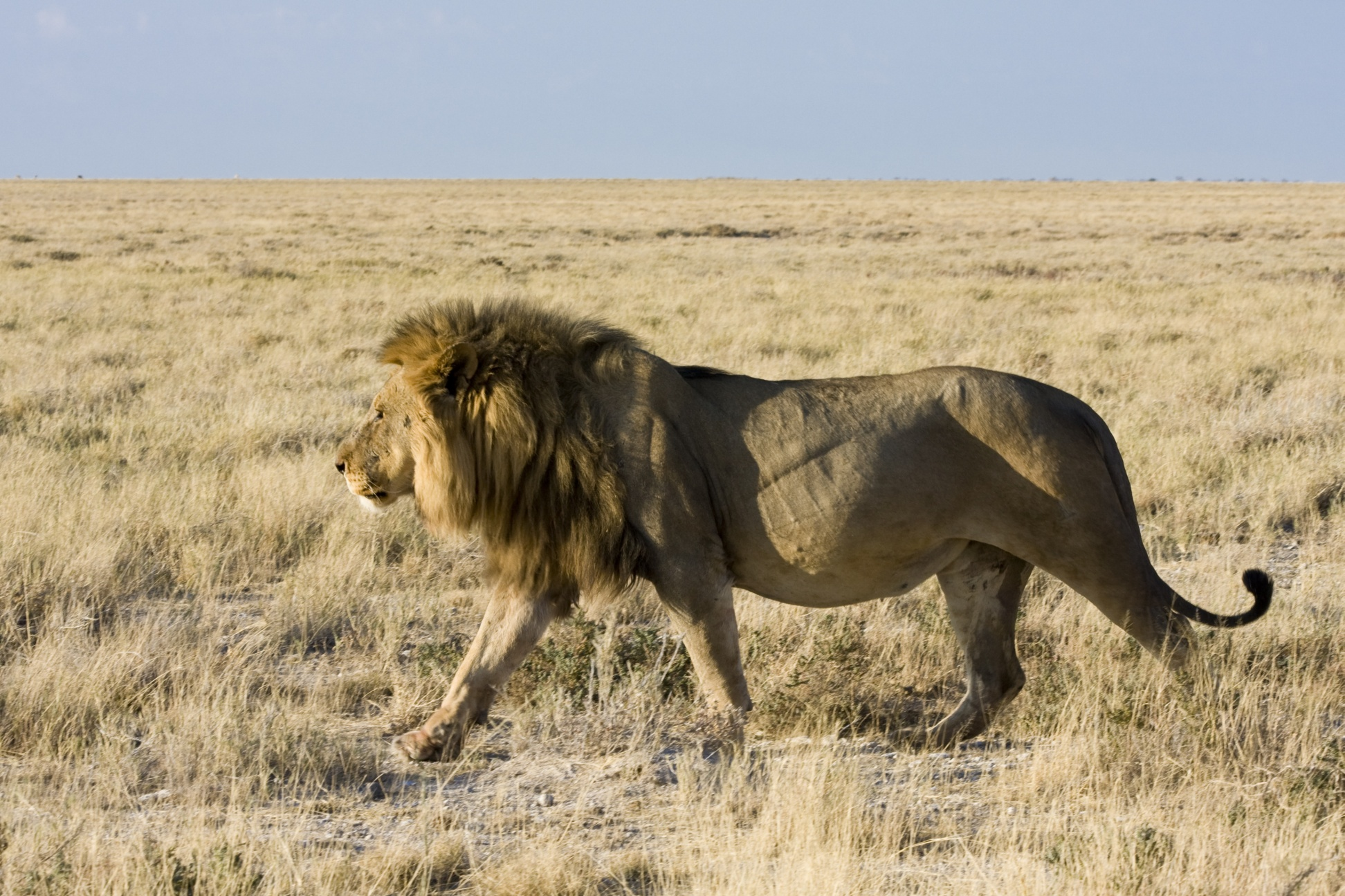
Lion in Etosha National Park, Namibia

Lions, which can be grouped into the southwestern clade are found in Angola, Northern Namibia, Northern Botswana and western Zimbabwe, extending southeast into the Tuli block. a There is a larger hybridization zone to the southeastern clade around the Kruger National Park.

Range countries	Lion Conservation Units	Area in km^{2}
Zimbabwe	Mapungubwe, Bubye	10,033
Botswana, Zimbabwe	Okavango−Hwange	99,552
Botswana	Xaixai	12,484
Angola	Kissama−Mumbondo, Bocoio−Camacuio, Alto Zambeze	393,760
Angola, Namibia	Etosha−Kunene	123,800
Namibia	Khaudum−Caprivi	92,372

== Characteristics ==
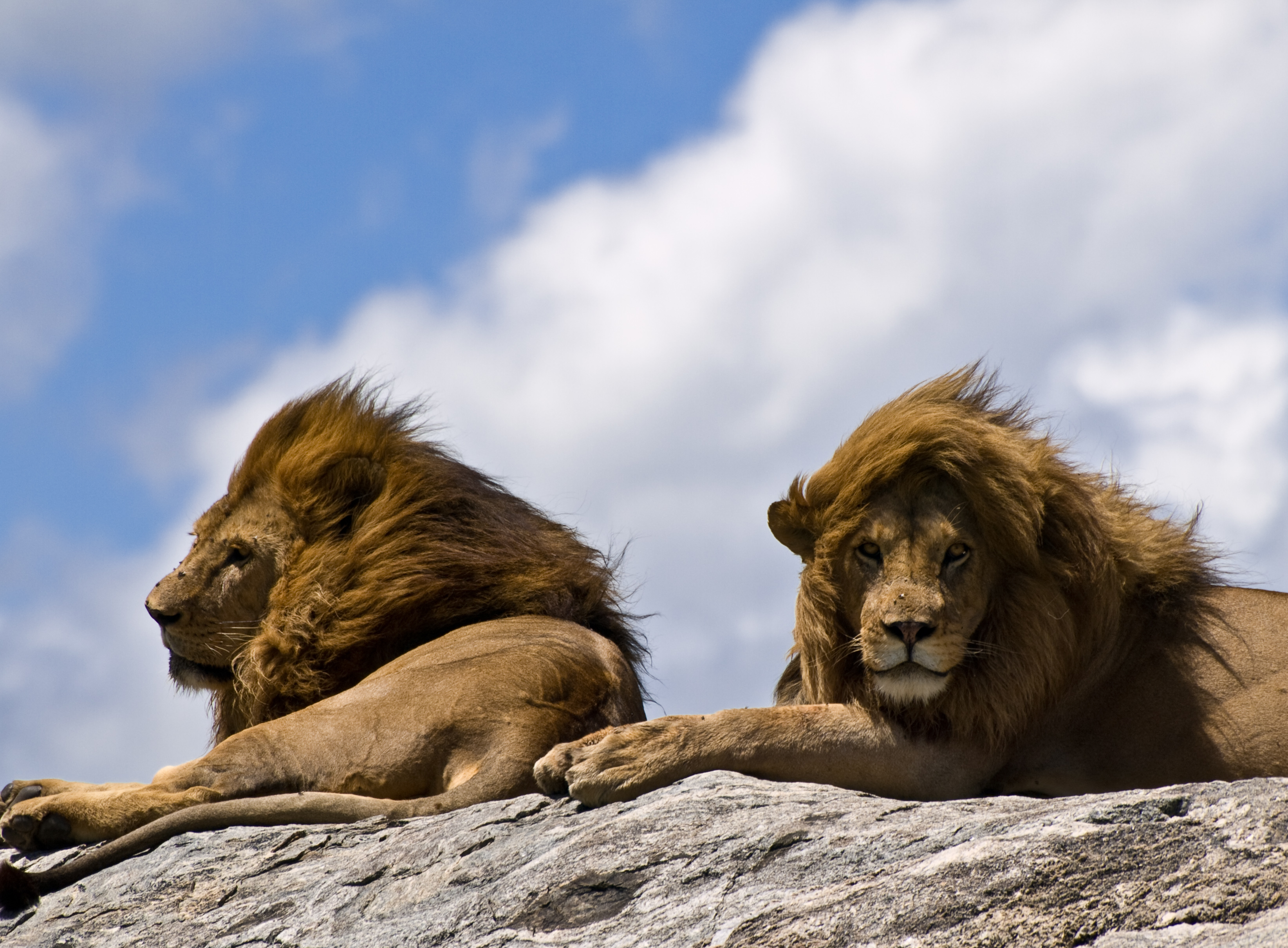
Adult male lions in Serengeti National Park

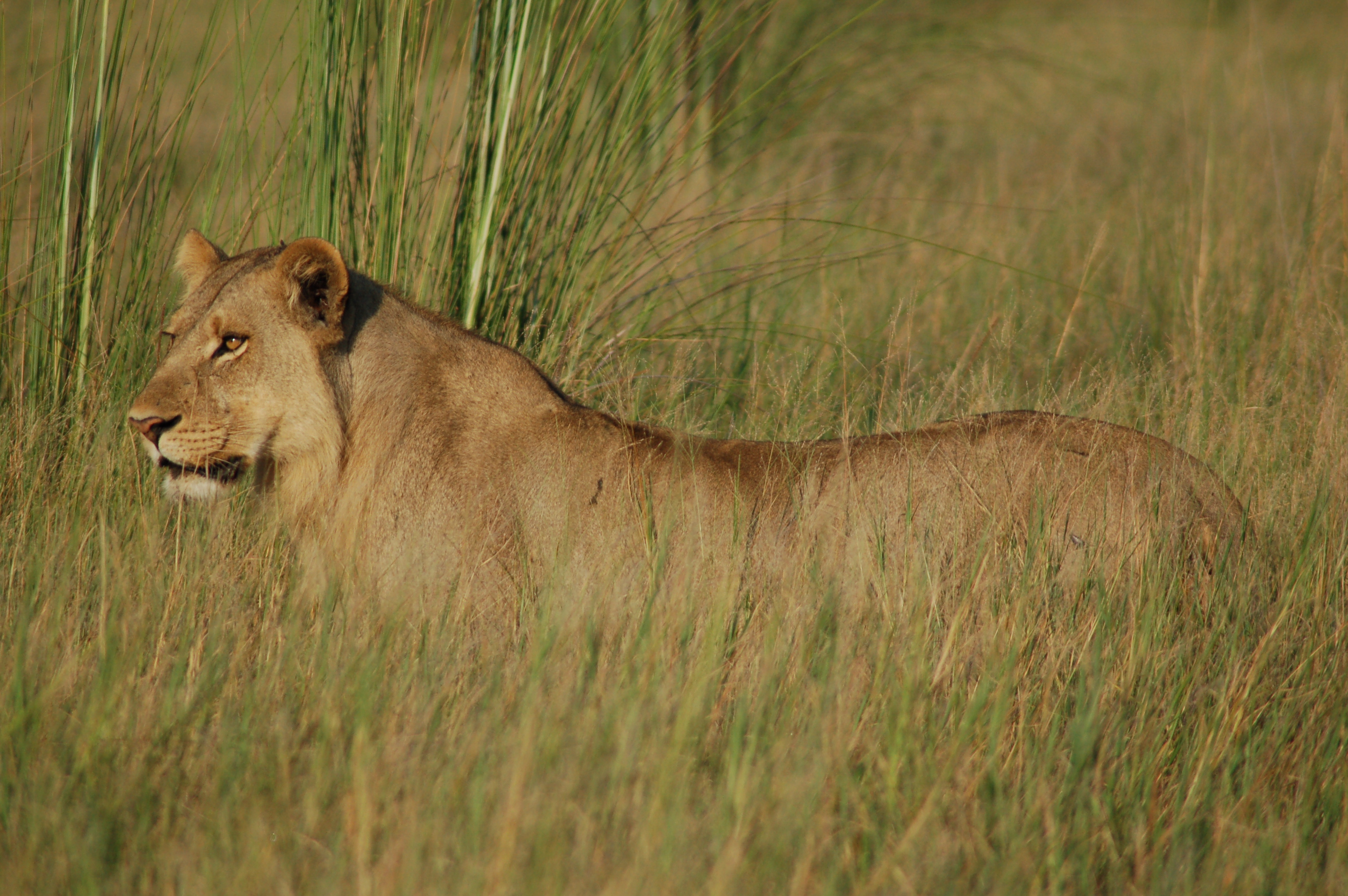
Female lion in the Okavango Delta

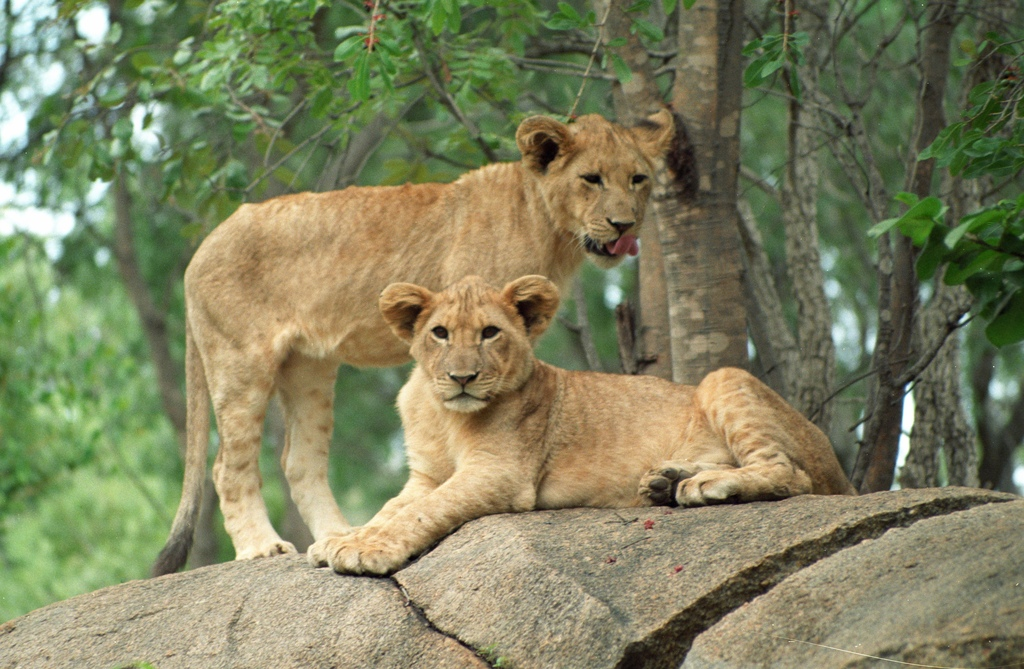
Lion cubs in Zimbabwe

The lion's fur varies in colour from light buff to dark brown. It has rounded ears and a black tail tuft.

=== Size and weight ===
Average head-to-body length of male lions is 2.47–2.84 m (8 ft 1 in – 9 ft 4 in) with a weight ranging from 150–225 kg (331–496 lb) averaging 187.5 kg (413 lb) in Southern Africa and 145.4–204.7 kg (321–451 lb) averaging 174.9 kg (386 lb) in East Africa. Females average 83–165 kg (183–364 lb) in Southern Africa and 90–167.8 kg (198–370 lb) in East Africa. Males in northern Kruger National Park weighed 200.01 kg (440.9 lb) on average, whereas females weighed 143.52 kg (316.4 lb) on average, and males in southern Kruger National Park weighed 186.55 kg (411.3 lb) on average and females weighed 118.37 kg (261.0 lb), though there was an outbreak of tuberculosis in southern park at the time. Skeletal muscles make up 58.8% of the lion's body weight.

The largest known lion measured 3.35 m (11.0 ft) in length and weighed 375 kg (825 lb). An exceptionally heavy male lion near Mount Kenya weighed 272 kg (600 lb). The longest wild lion reportedly was a male shot near Mucusso National Park in southern Angola in 1973. In 1936, a man-eating lion shot in 1936 in eastern Transvaal weighed about 313 kg (690 lb), and was considered to have been one of the heaviest wild lions. In 1963, two lions in Tanzania weighed 320 and 360 kg (700 and 800 lb) after killing several livestock.

=== Manes ===
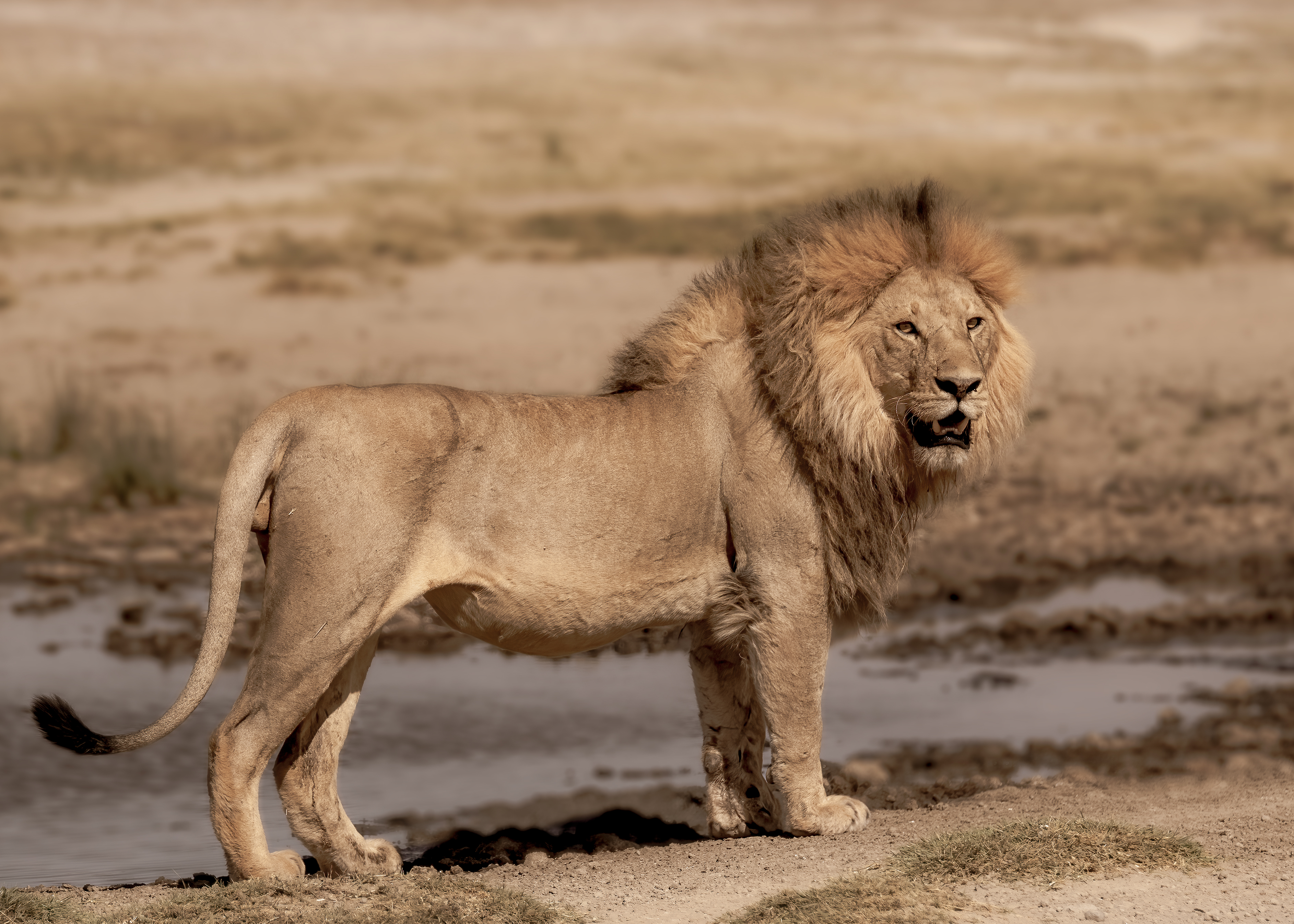
Lion in Serengeti National Park

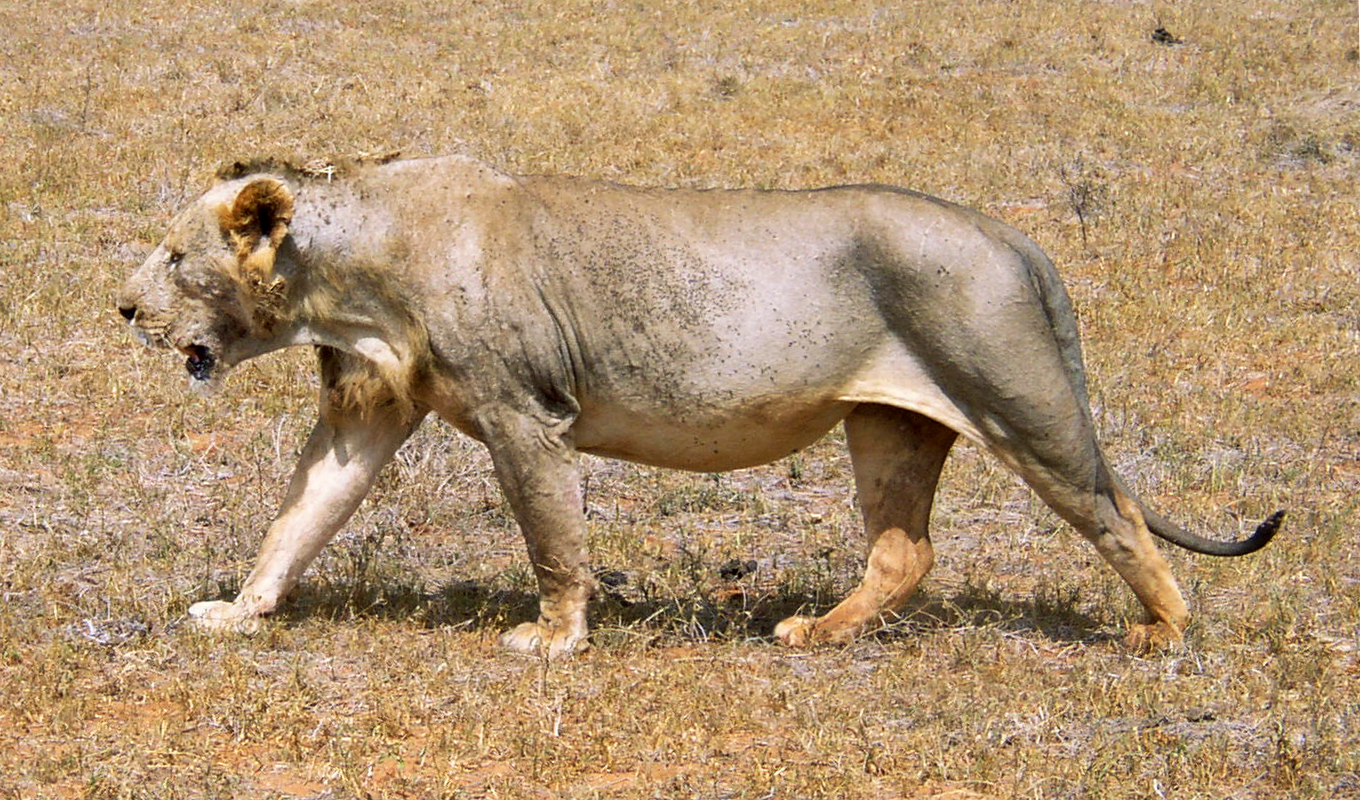
A maneless lion in Tsavo East National Park, Kenya

In the 19th and 20th centuries, lion type specimens were described on the basis of their mane size and colour. Mane colour varies from sandy, tawny, isabelline, light reddish yellow to dark brown and black. Mane length varies from short to extending to knee joints and under the belly. Lions without a mane were observed in the Tsavo area.

Mane development is related to age: older males have more extensive manes than younger ones; manes continue to grow up to the age of four to five years, long after lions become sexually mature. Males living in the Kenyan highlands above elevations of 800 m (2,600 ft) develop heavier manes than lions in the more humid and warmer lowlands of eastern and northern Kenya. Average ambient temperature, nutrition and testosterone influence the colour and size of the mane. Its length is an indicator for age and fighting ability of the lion. In Serengeti National Park, female lions favour males with dense and dark manes as mates.

=== Skull ===
Skulls of males measure 321.0–401.0 mm (12.64–15.79 in), with a condylobasal length of 309.0–348.0 mm (12.17–13.70 in) and 222.0–256.0 mm (8.74–10.08 in) in zygomatic width. Skulls of lionesses measure 292.0–333.0 mm (11.50–13.11 in), with a condylobasal length of 263.0–291.0 mm (10.35–11.46 in) and 188.0–212.0 mm (7.40–8.35 in) in zygomatic width. The mean greatest lengths of skulls are 357.2 ± 1.37 mm (14.063 ± 0.054 in) and 295.2 ± 0.92 mm (11.622 ± 0.036 in) for adult males and females, respectively. The means for sub-adult males and females are 329.4 ± 3.23 mm (12.969 ± 0.127 in) and 283.5 ± 3.85 mm (11.161 ± 0.152 in), respectively.

Skulls of Cape lions are about 25 mm (1.0 in) on average longer than those of equatorial lions and narrower than those from Ethiopia, Sudan and West Africa. The mean greatest lengths of skulls of male and female Kruger lions respectively are 380 ± 3.9 cm (149.6 ± 1.5 in) and 314 ± 3.2 cm (123.6 ± 1.3 in).

=== White lion ===
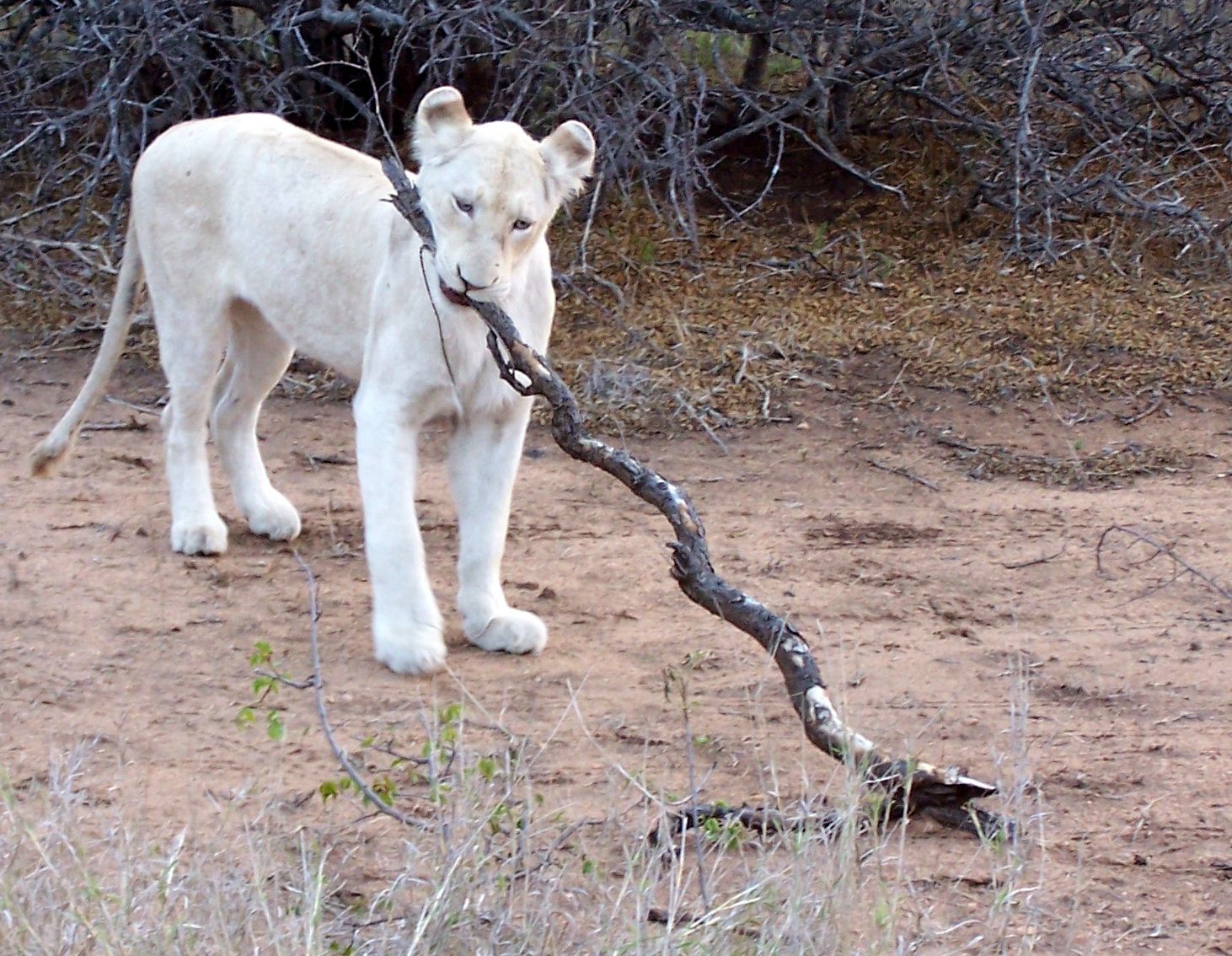
A cub in Kruger National Park

White lions have occasionally been encountered in and around South Africa's Kruger National Park and the adjacent Timbavati Private Game Reserve. Their whitish fur is a rare morph caused by a double recessive allele. It has normal pigmentation in eyes and skin. They were removed from the wild in the 1970s, thus decreasing the white lion gene pool. Nevertheless, 17 births have been recorded in five different prides between 2007 and 2015. White lions were selected for breeding in captivity. They have been bred in South African camps for use as trophies to be killed during canned hunts.

== Behaviour and ecology ==
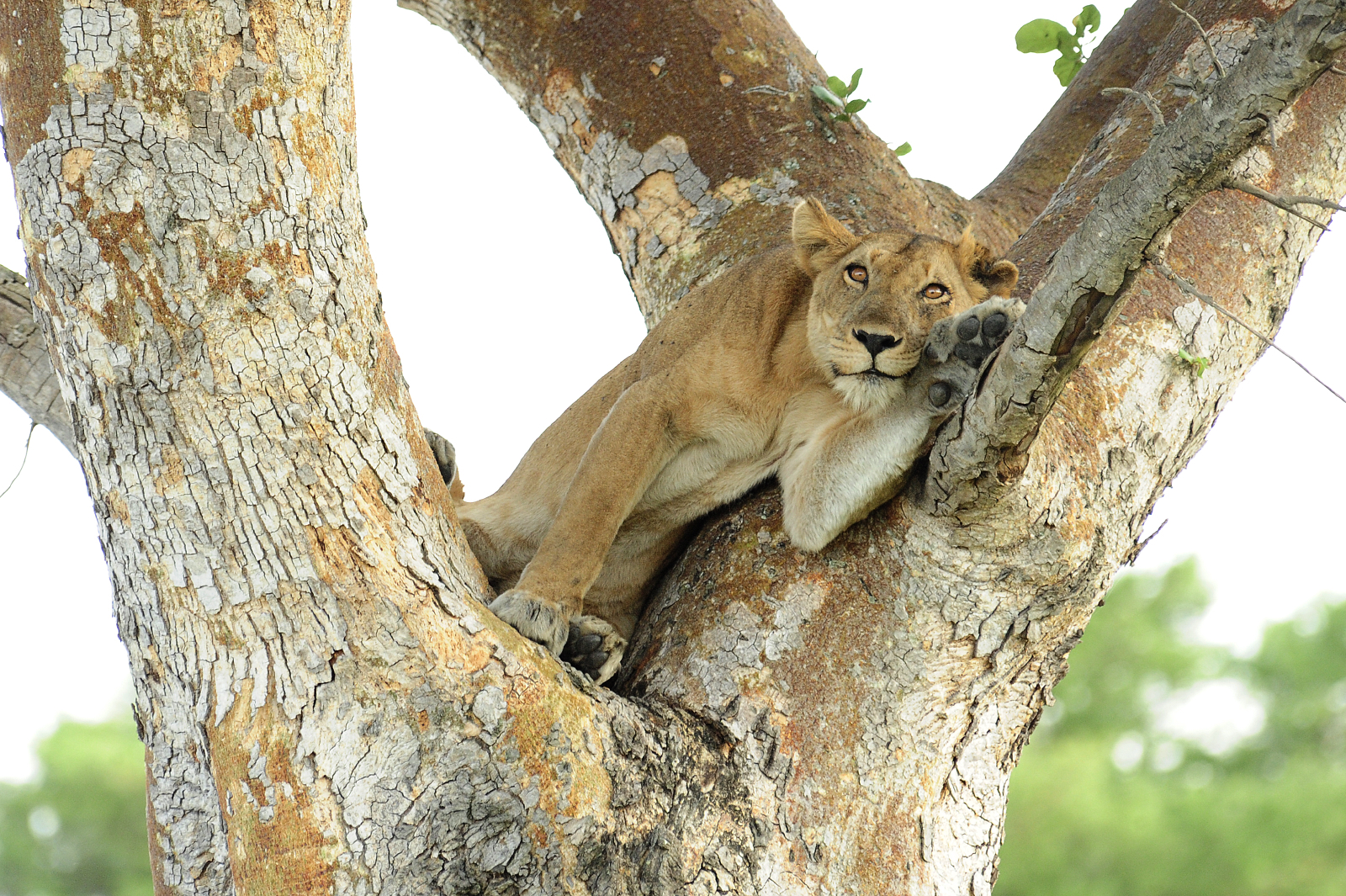
Tree-climbing lion in Murchison Falls National Park

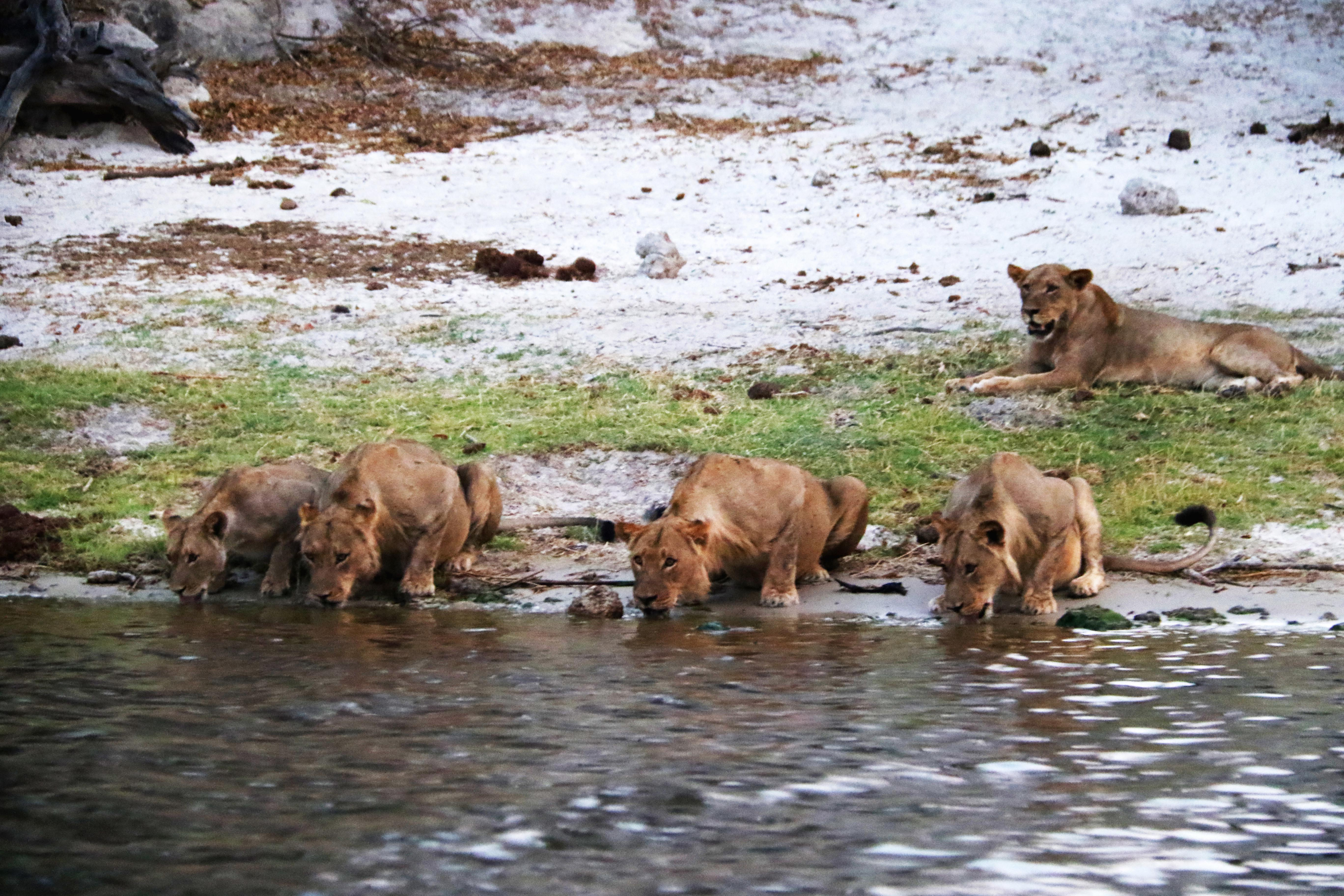
Lion pride at the Zambezi River

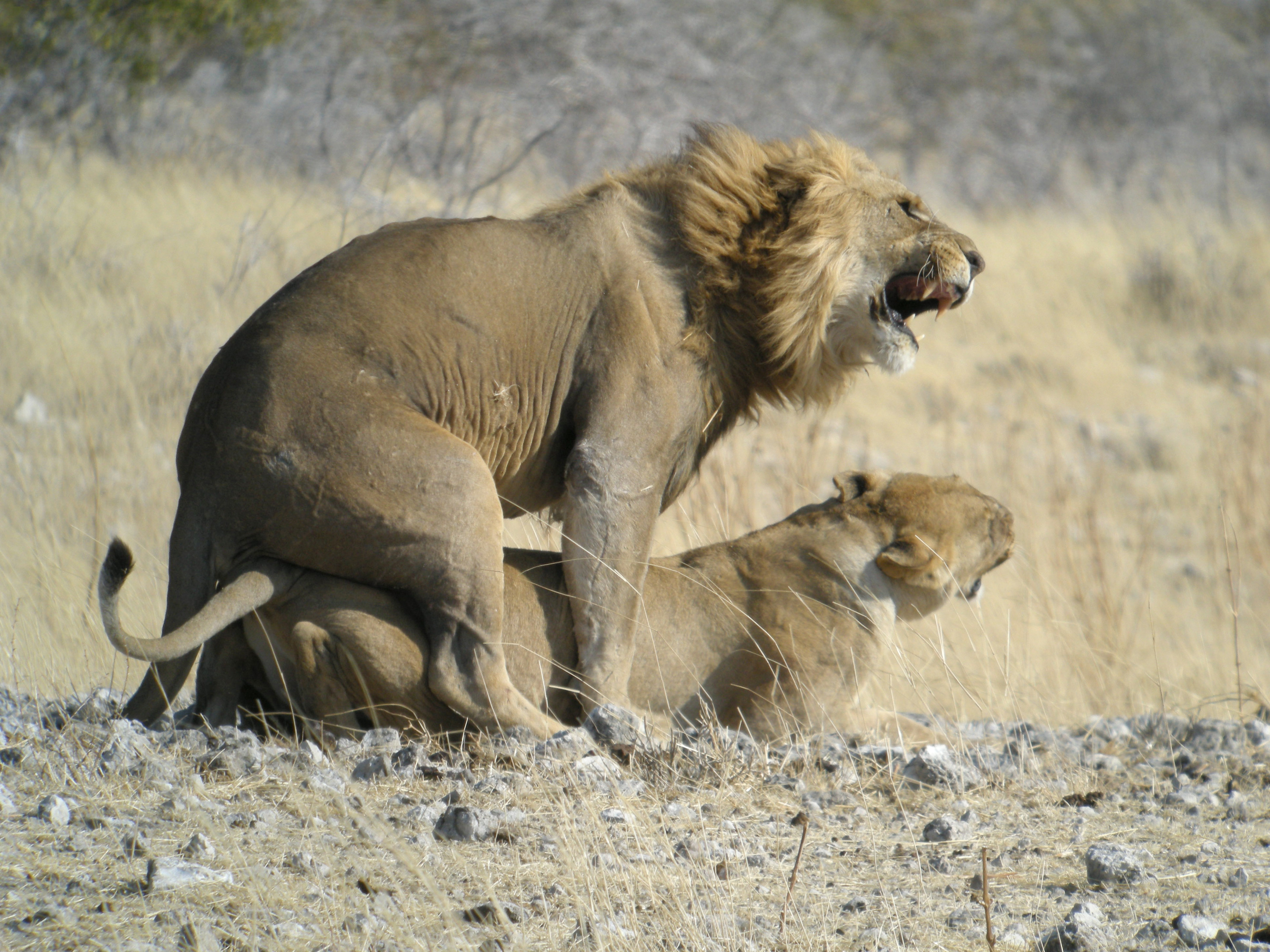
Lions mating in Etosha National Park

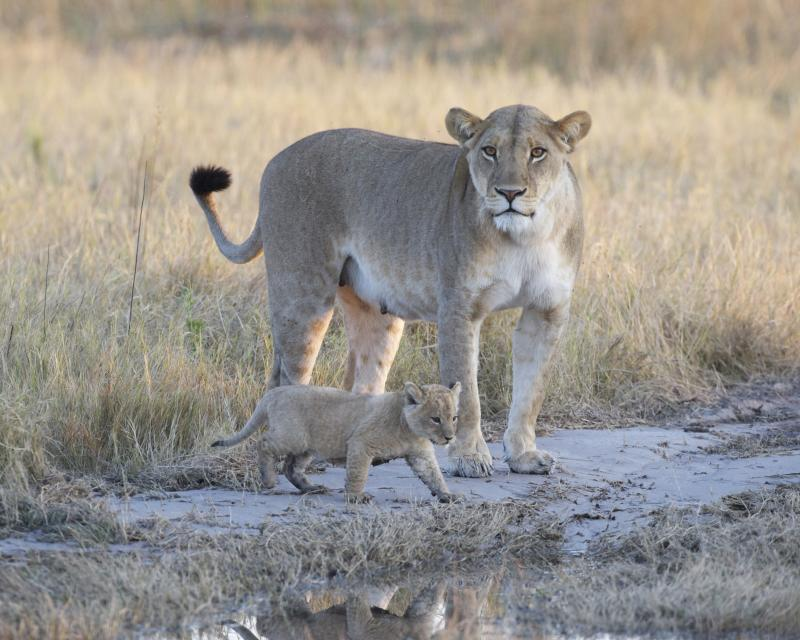
A lioness with her cub in Botswana

In Serengeti National Park, monitoring of lion prides started in 1966. Between 1966 and 1972, two observed lion prides comprised between seven and 10 females each. Females had litters once in 23 months on average. Litters contained two to three cubs. Of 87 cubs born until 1970, only 12 reached the age of two years. Cubs died due to starvation in months when large prey was not available, or following take-over of the prides by new males. Male lions in coalitions are closely related. Between 1974 and 2012, 471 coalitions comprising 796 male lions entered a study area of 2,000 km^{2} (770 sq mi). Of these, 35 coalitions included male lions that were born in the area but had left and returned after about two years of absence. Nomadic coalitions became resident at between 3.5 and 7.3 years of age.

The lion population of Selous Game Reserve has been surveyed since 1996. Lion prides avoided acacia woodlands and preferred habitats near water courses with short grasses, where also prey species gathered. Two or more prides shared home ranges.

In Kavango–Zambezi Transfrontier Conservation Area, lions have been monitored since 1999. In 2003, 50 lions were radio-collared in Hwange National Park and tracked until 2012. Results show that adult male and female lions preferred grassland and shrubland habitat, but avoided woodlands and areas with high human density. By contrast, subadult dispersing male lions avoided grasslands and shrublands, but moved in human-dominated areas to a larger extent. Hence, dispersing lions are more vulnerable to coming into conflict with humans than adult lions. In the semi-arid savanna of Zimbabwe's Hwange National Park, 19 lions were radio-collared and tracked between 2002 and 2007. Both female and male lions moved foremost within 2 km (1.2 mi) of waterholes in all seasons.

Lions living near ranches in the vicinity of Tsavo East National Park consisted of three prides, two pairs and a single lion in 2002.

=== Hunting and diet ===
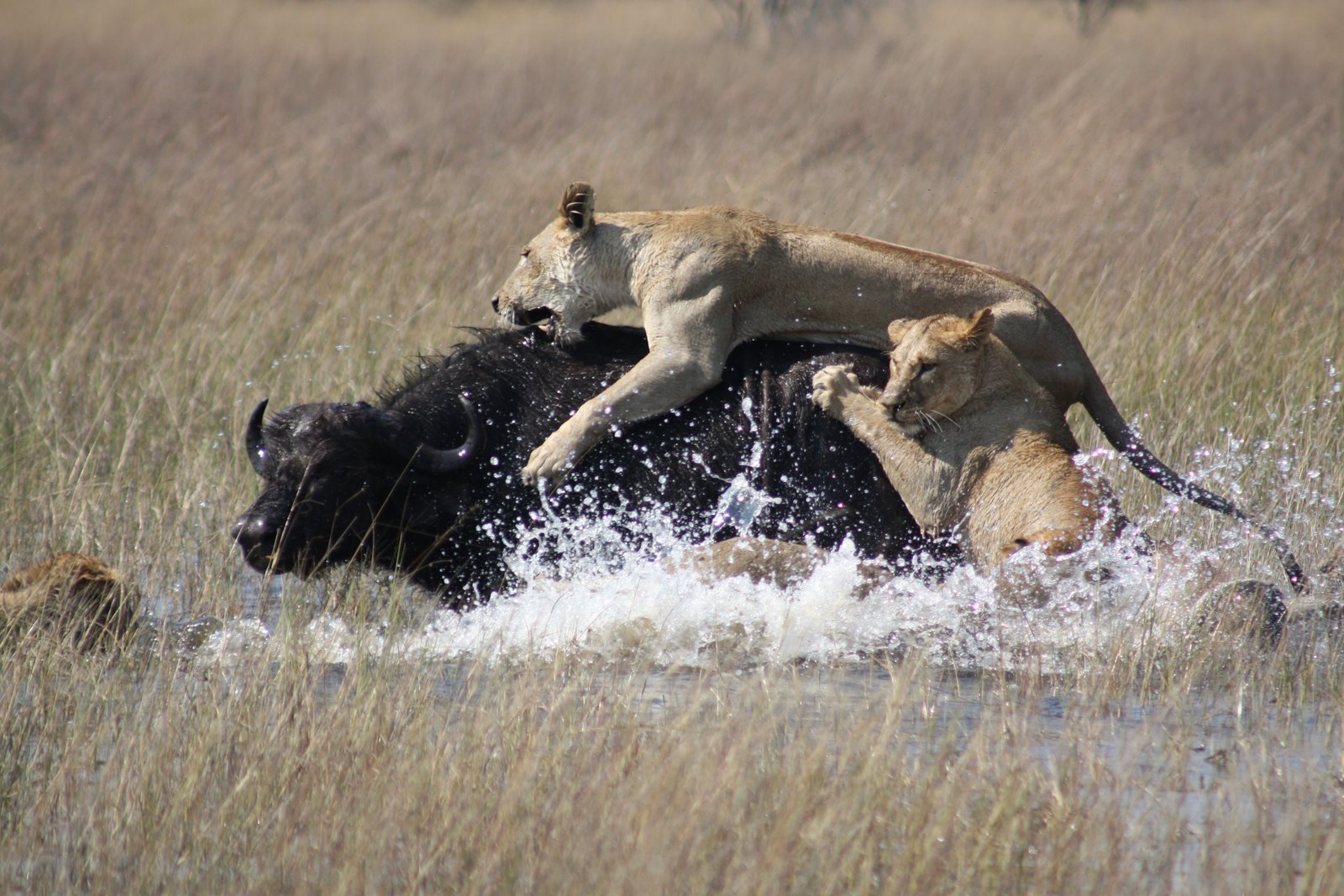
Lionesses hunting a Cape buffalo in the Okavango Delta

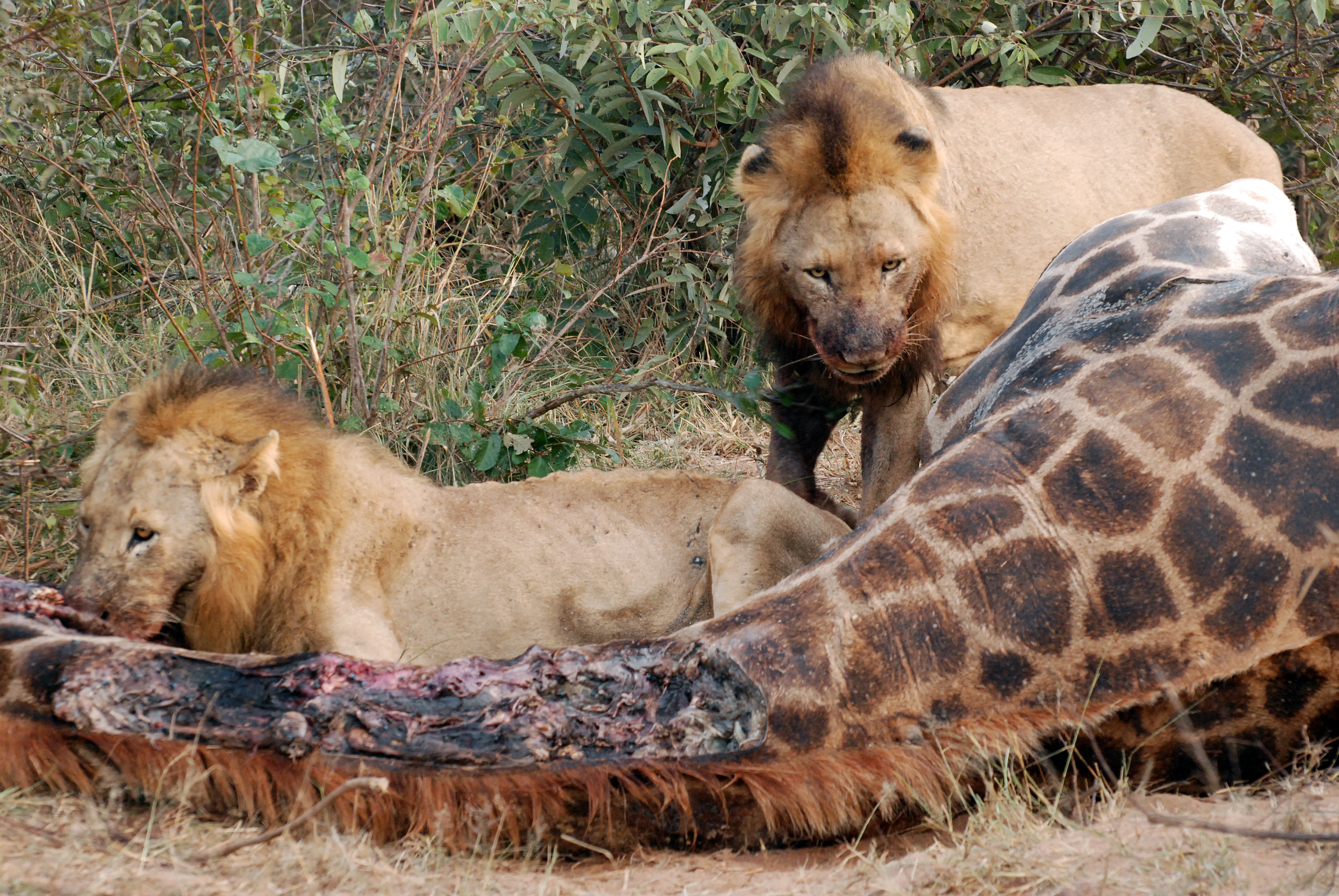
Lions feeding on a giraffe in Kruger National Park

Lions usually hunt in groups and prey foremost on ungulates such as gemsbok (Oryx gazella), Cape buffalo (Syncerus caffer), blue wildebeest (Connochaetes taurinus), giraffe (Giraffa camelopardalis), common eland (Tragelaphus oryx), greater kudu (T. strepsiceros), nyala (T. angasii), roan antelope (Hippotragus equinus), sable antelope (H. niger), plains zebra (Equus quagga), bushpig (Potamochoerus larvatus), common warthog (Phacochoerus africanus), hartebeest (Alcephalus buselaphus), common tsessebe (Damaliscus lunatus), waterbuck (Kobus ellipsiprymnus), kob (K. kob) and Thomson's gazelle (Eudorcas thomsonii). Their prey is usually in the range of 190–550 kg (420–1,210 lb). In the Serengeti National Park, lions were observed to also scavenge on carrion of animals that were killed by other predators, or died from natural causes. They kept a constant lookout for circling vultures, apparently being aware that vultures indicate a dead animal. Faeces of lions collected near waterholes in Hwange National Park also contained remains of climbing mice (Dendromus) and common mice (Mus).

In Botswana's Chobe National Park, lions also prey on young and subadult African bush elephants (Loxodonta africana). They successfully attacked 74 elephants between 1993 and 1996, of which 26 were older than nine years, and one bull over 15 years old. In October 2005, a pride of up to 30 lions killed eight African bush elephants that were between four and eleven years old.

=== Attacks on humans ===
Several cases of lion attacking people have been documented:

- In the 1890s, two Tsavo Man-Eaters attacked workers during the building of the Uganda Railway. Their skulls and skins are part of the zoological collection of the Field Museum of Natural History. The total number of people killed is unclear, but allegedly 135 people fell victim to these lions in less than a year before Colonel Patterson killed them.
- The Njombe lions were a lion pride in Njombe in former Tanganyika, which are thought to have preyed on 1,500 to 2,000 people. They were killed by George Gilman Rushby.
- Between 1990 and 2004, lions killed more than 560 people in Tanzania, mostly during harvest season in crop fields and in areas where natural prey is scarce.
- In February 2018, lions killed a suspected poacher near Kruger National Park.
- In February 2018, Kevin Richardson took three lions for a walk at Dinokeng Game Reserve in South Africa. A lioness pursued an impala for at least 2 km (1.2 mi) and killed a young woman near her car.
- In July 2018, human remains were found in the lion enclosure of a privately owned reserve in South Africa. They were suspected to have been rhino poachers, as they had a high-powered rifle with a silencer, an axe and wire cutters.

== Threats ==
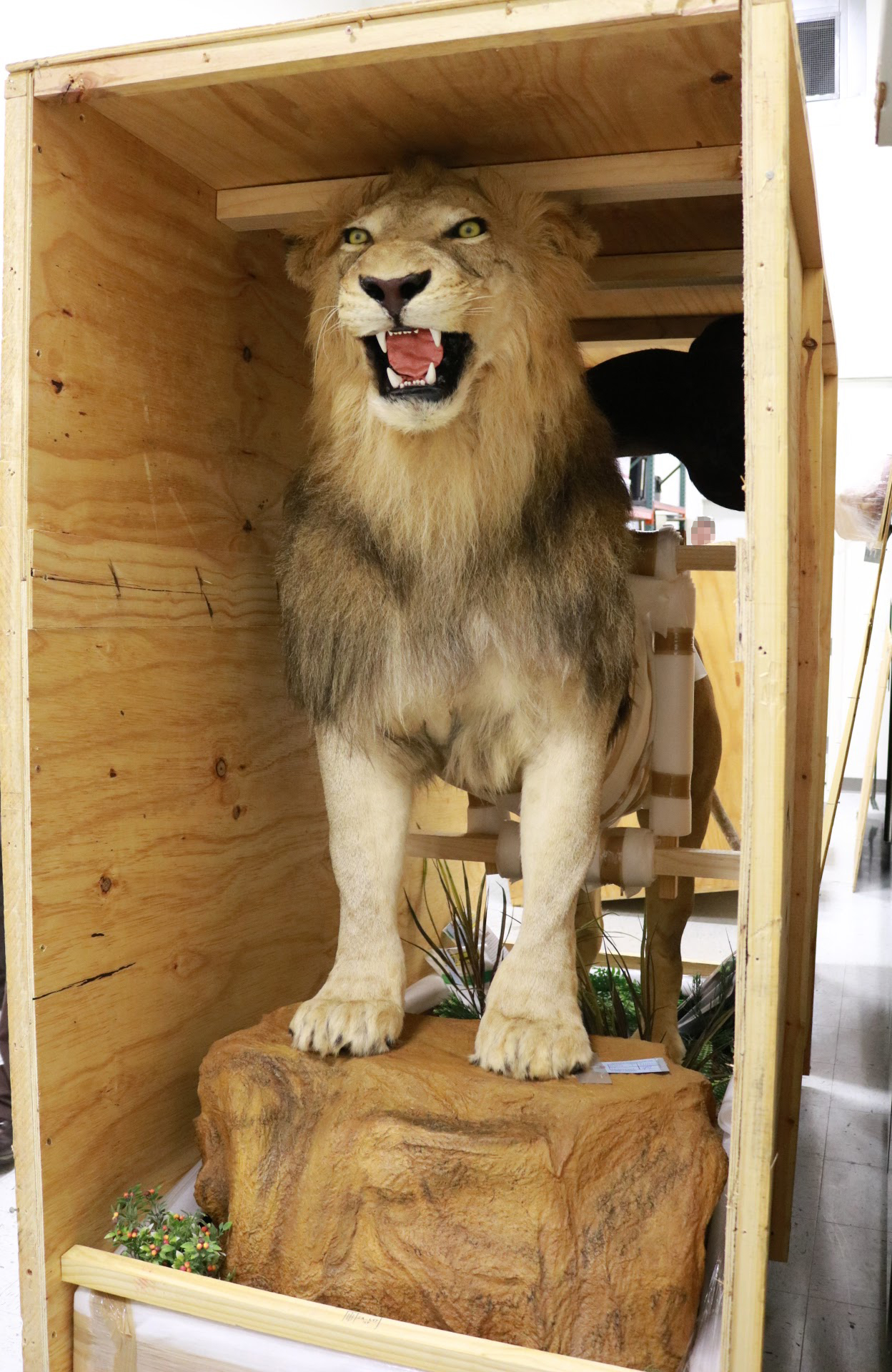
Taxidermied lion trophy seized by U.S. Fish and Wildlife Service in 2017

In Africa, lions are threatened by pre-emptive killing or in retaliation for preying on livestock. Prey base depletion, loss and conversion of habitat have led to a number of subpopulations becoming small and isolated. Trophy hunting has contributed to population declines in Botswana, Namibia, Zimbabwe and Zambia. It is the primary cause for a decline of lion populations in Tanzania's Selous Game Reserve and Katavi National Park. Although lions and their prey are officially protected in Tsavo National Parks, they are regularly killed by local people, with over 100 known lion killings between 2001 and 2006.

Between 2008 and 2013, bones and body parts from at least 2621 individual lions were exported from South Africa to Southeast Asia, and another 3437 lion skeletons between 2014 and 2016. Lion bones are used to replace tiger bones in traditional Asian medicines. Private game ranches in South Africa also breed lions for the canned hunting industry.

In 2014, seven lions in Ikona Wildlife Management Area were reportedly poisoned by a herdsman for attacking his cattle. In February 2018, the carcasses of two male and four female lions were found dead in Ruaha National Park, and were suspected to have died of poisoning.

In 2015 and 2017, two male lions, Cecil and his son Xanda, were killed by trophy hunters in Zimbabwe's Hwange National Park.

Uncontrolled bushfires and hunting of lions and prey species in Zambia's Kafue National Park make it difficult for the lion population to recover. Cub mortality in particular is high.

== Conservation ==
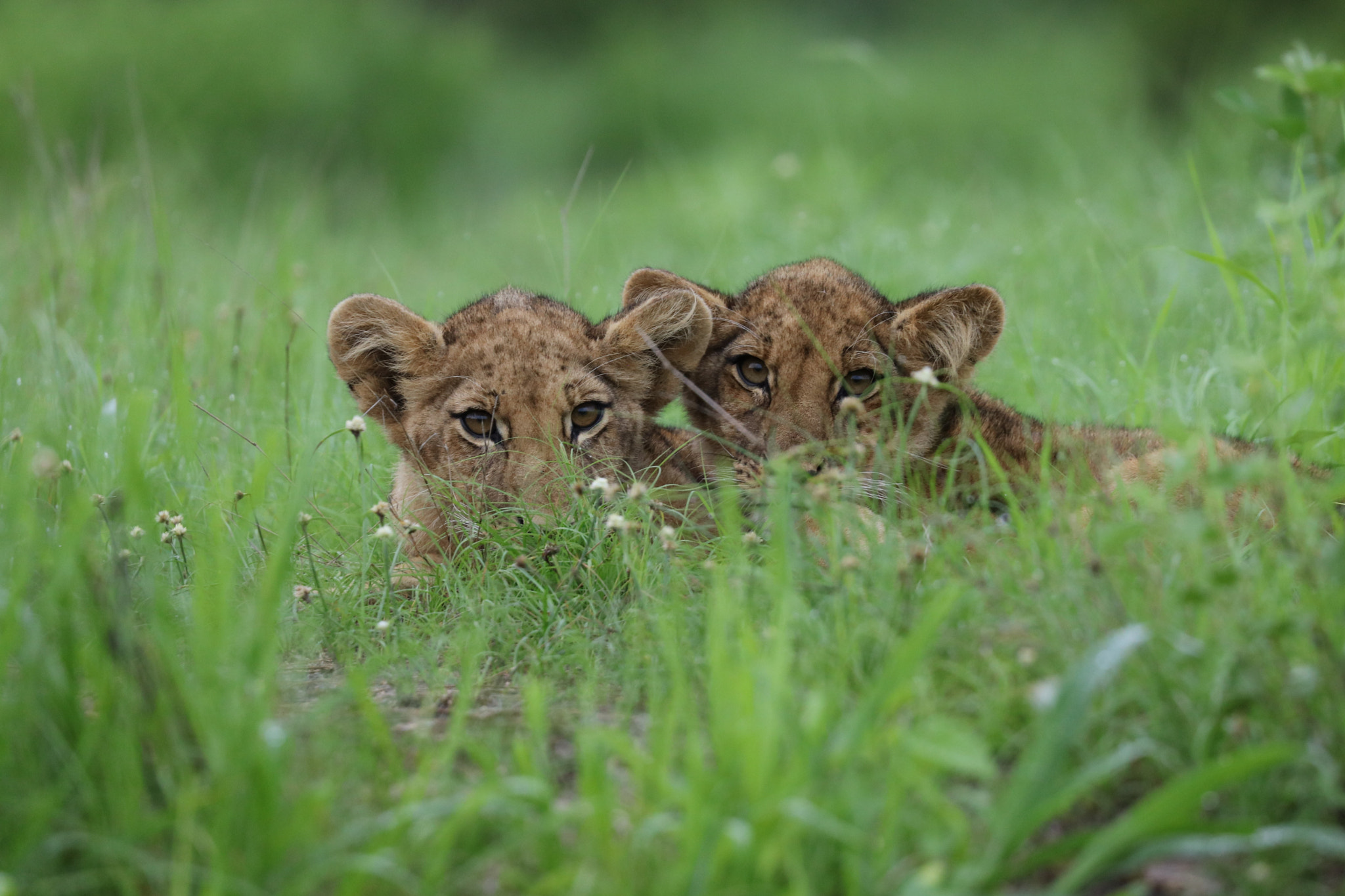
Lion cubs in Botswana

African lions are included in CITES Appendix II. Today, lion populations are stable only in large protected area complexes. IUCN regional offices and many wildlife conservation organisations cooperated to develop a Lion Conservation Strategy for Eastern and Southern Africa in 2006. The strategy envisages to maintain sufficient habitat, ensure a sufficient wild prey base, make lion-human coexistence sustainable and reduce factors that lead to further fragmentation of populations. Local communities in several Southern African lion range countries generate significant income through wildlife tourism, which is a strong incentive for their support of conservation measures.

Establishing corridors between protected areas is important for facilitating dispersal of lions. Makgadikgadi Pans National Park and Central Kalahari Game Reserve are key dispersal areas in Southern Africa.

=== In captivity ===
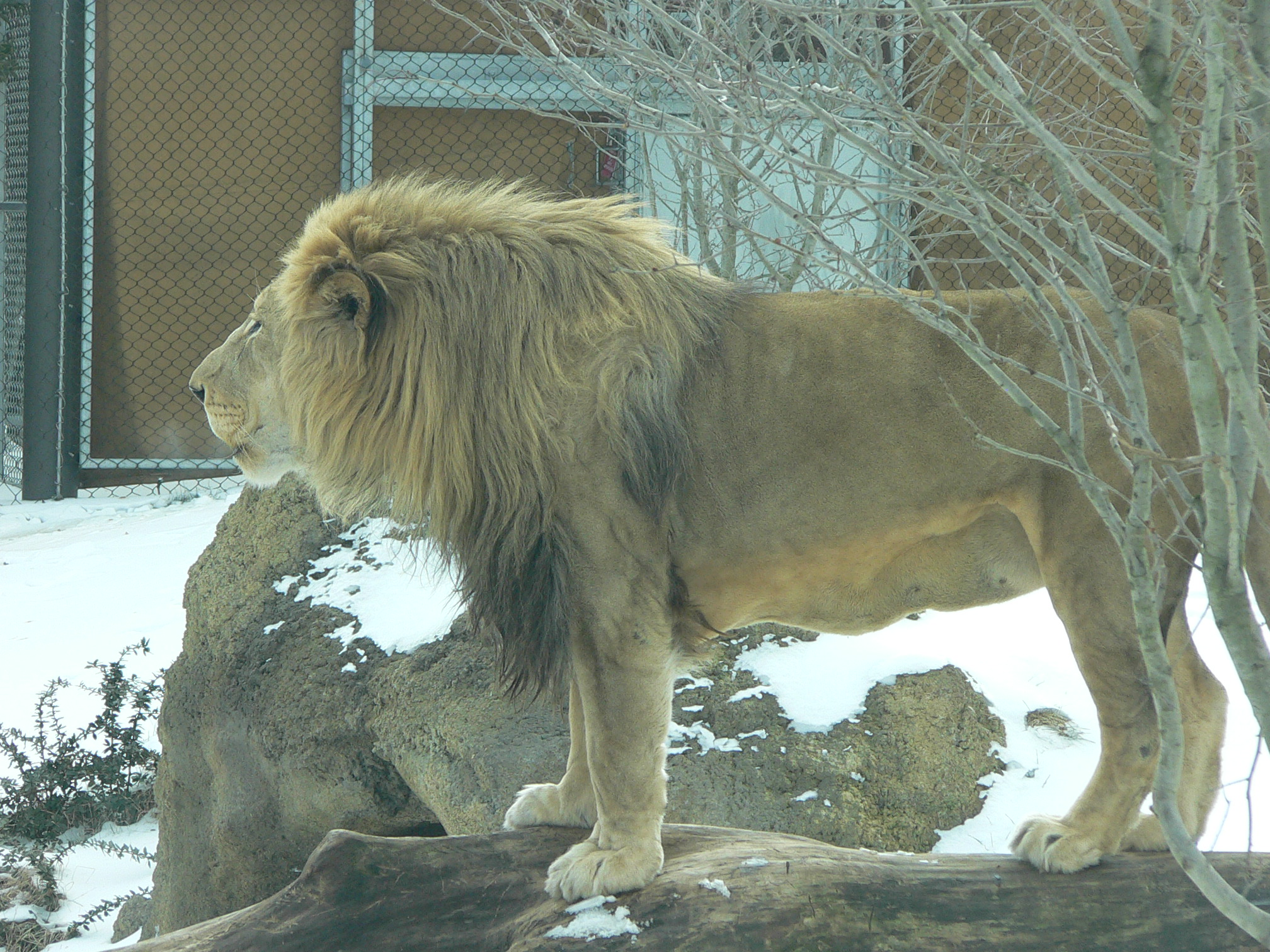
Captive lion in Philadelphia Zoo

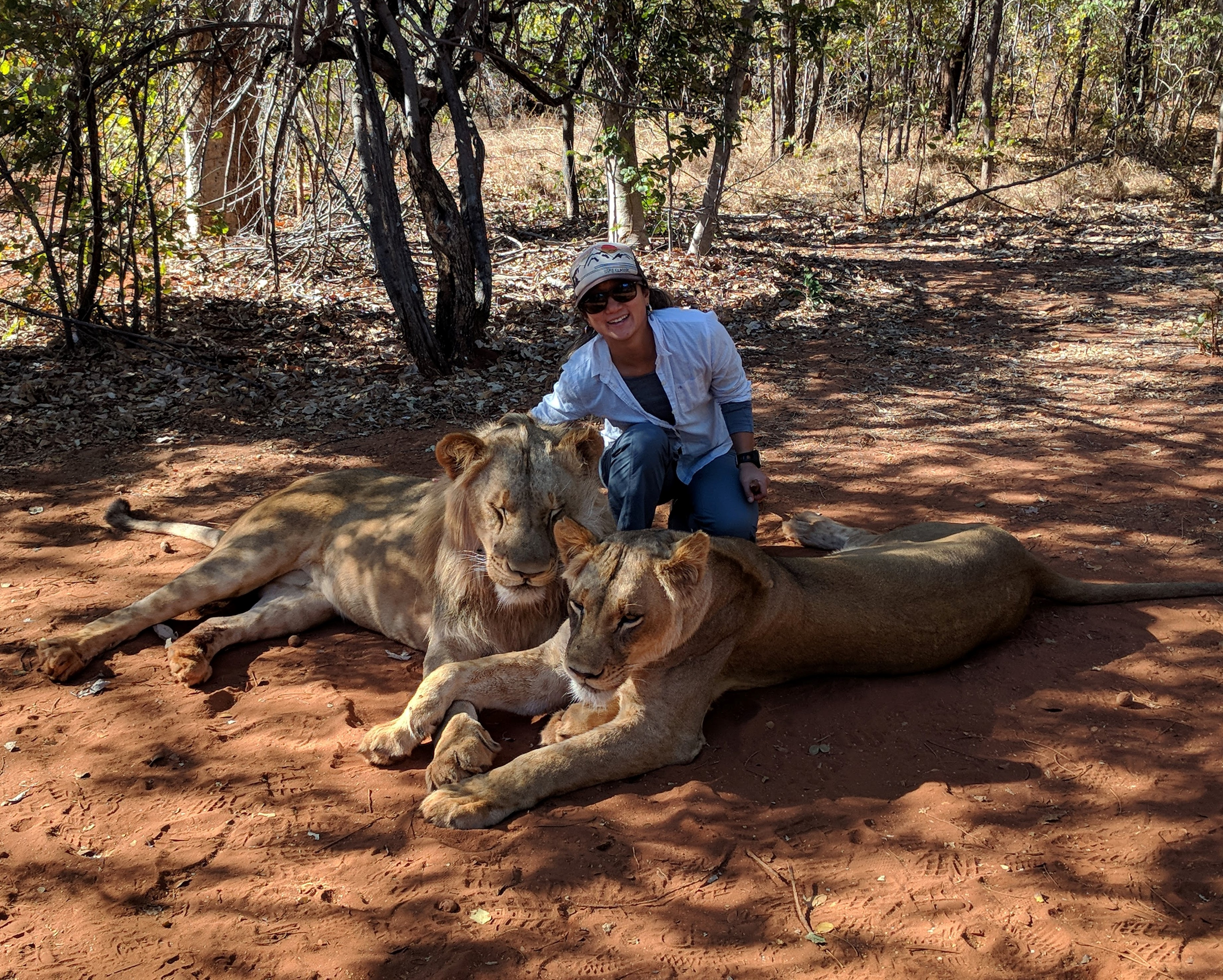
Tourist petting tame lions, Livingstone, Zambia

At the beginning of the 21st century, the Addis Ababa Zoo kept 16 adult lions. It is assumed that their ancestors, five males and two females, were caught in southwestern Ethiopia as part of a zoological collection for Emperor Haile Selassie I.

In 2006, eight captive lions were registered under the name P. l. massaicus, and 23 as P. l. nubicus from Tanzania by the International Species Information System; about 100 captive lions were registered as P. l. krugeri, which derived from lions captured in South Africa.

In 2012, samples of lions kept at Sana'a Zoo in Yemen were found to cluster with those of lions from East and Southern Africa.

== Cultural significance ==
The Coat of arms of South Africa featured a lion from 1910 to 1932

The lion is an animal symbol in shamanistic rituals of the Nuer people. In other East African cultures, it symbolizes laziness. Scars inflicted by lions are regarded as a sign of courage among the Masai people. The name 'Simba' is a Swahili word for the lion, which also means 'aggressive', 'king' and 'strong'.

== Regional names ==
Lion populations in Southern and East Africa were referred to by several regional names, including Katanga lion, Transvaal lion, Kalahari lion, Southeast African lion, and Southwest African lion, Masai lion, Serengeti lion, Tsavo lion and Uganda lion. It has also been referred to as 'Eastern-Southern African lion', 'Southern lion', and as 'southern subspecies'.

== See also ==
- Wild cats in Africa: African leopard · African golden cat · Caracal · Serval · African wildcat · Sand cat · Black-footed cat · Cheetah
- African Cats
- Born Free
- Elsa the lioness
- The Lion King
- Mapogo lion coalition
- Pride
