= Biharamulo District =

District in Kagera Region, Tanzania

Biharamulo District Wilaya ya Biharamulo
- District
- Biharamulo District of Kagera Region
- Coordinates: 2.633333°S 31.316667°E
- Country: Tanzania
- Region: Kagera Region

Government
  - Type: Council
  - Body: Biharamulo District Council
  - District Commissioner: Kemilembe Rose Lwota
  - District Secretary: Venance S. Martin
  - Chairman of Council: Leo Methew Rushahu

Area
  - Total: 7,464 km^{2} (2,882 sq mi)
- Elevation: 1,200 m (3,900 ft)
- Highest elevation: 1,410 m (4,630 ft)
- Lowest elevation: 1,135 m (3,724 ft)

Population (2022 census)
  - Total: 457,114
  - Density: 61.24/km^{2} (158.6/sq mi)
- Time zone: EAT
- Area code: 028
- Website: District Website

Biharamulo District is one of the eight districts of the Kagera Region of Tanzania. It is bordered to the north by Karagwe District and Muleba District, to the east and south by Geita Region, to the west by Ngara District, and to the southwest by the Kigoma Region. Its administrative seat is Biharamulo town. Biharamulo Game Reserve is located within the borders of the district.

According to the 2012 Tanzania National Census, the population of Biharamulo District was 323,486, from 409,389 in 2002, and 209,279 in 1988. This decline in population can be explained from the fact that Chato District was split off from Biharamulo District in between the 2002 and the 2012 census. The district area is 7,464 square kilometres (2,882 sq mi), with a population density of 43.34 square kilometres (16.73 sq mi) There are 17 wards, 74 villages and 384 suburbs in the district.

== Transport ==
=== Road ===
Several trunk roads pass through Biharamulo District: T3 from Morogoro to the Rwanda border, T4 from Mwanza to Bukoba and T9 from Biharamulo to Kigoma.

== Administrative subdivisions ==
In 2002 the district was divided into 21 wards, but many of these are now part of Chato District. As of 2012, Biharamulo District was administratively divided into 15 wards.

=== Wards ===
- Biharamulo Mjini
- Bisibo
- Kabindi
- Kalenge
- Kaniha
- Lusahunga
- Nemba
- Nyabusozi
- Nyakahura
- Nyamahanga
- Nyamigogo
- Nyantakara
- Nyarubungo
- Runazi
- Ruziba
