= Biharamulo =

- Town
- Location of Biharamulo.
- Coordinates: 02°38′S 31°19′E
- Country: Tanzania
- Region: Kagera Region
- District: Biharamulo District

Population (2012)
  - Total: 24,573
- Time zone: GMT + 3
- Area code: 028
- Climate: Aw
- Website: www.kagera.go.tz

Biharamulo is a town in northwestern Tanzania. It is the district headquarter of Biharamulo District. Biharamulo used to be a German administrative centre in colonial times. Biharamulo Forest Reserve is located north of the town.

== History ==
The town was the administrative centre of German East Africa during the late 19th century until World War I. Since then it has remained part of the Biharamulo District.

== Transport ==
Trunk road T4 from Mwanza to Bukoba passes by the town and trunk road T9 to Kigoma Region start in Biharamulo.

== Population ==
According to the 2012 national census the population of Biharamulo town - 'Biharamulo Mjini' ward - is 24,573.

== Politics ==
Biharamulo has a unique political trend whereby it is difficult for a member of Parliament to save to natural retirement. Previously Biharamulo included Chato division before Chato was upgraded to a district. Members of Parliament for Biharamulo include Chief Stanslaus Rugaba Kasusura (1965 - 1985); Phares Kashemeza Kabuye (1985 - 1995, 2005 - 2009); Anatory Kasazi Choya (1995 - 2005); Oscar Rwegasira Mukasa (2009 - 2010, 2015 - 2020); Anthony Gervas Mbasa (2010 - 2015); Ezra John Chilewesa (from 2020...)

== Climate ==
Climate data for Biharamulo
Month	Jan	Feb	Mar	Apr	May	Jun	Jul	Aug	Sep	Oct	Nov	Dec	Year
