= Biharamulo Forest Reserve =

Coordinates: 2.633333°S 31.316667°E

- IUCN category IV (habitat/species management area)
- Interactive map of Biharamulo Forest Reserve
- Area: 1,462.32 km^{2} (564.60 sq mi)
- Designation: Forest reserve
- Designated: 1954
- Governing body: Tanzania Forest Services (TFS) Agency

Biharamulo Forest Reserve is a protected area in Tanzania. It was established in 1954. This site is 1462.32 km^{2}.

It is located in Biharamulo District, Kagera Region, not far from Biharamulo town. Lake Victoria lies at the North Eastern corner of the park.

During the rainy season, which lasts from January to April, a large number of bird watchers from all over the world gather. The most common bird species in this area are Martial Eagle, Sacred Ibis, Saddles, and Billed Stork.

The Biharamulo Forest Reserve, like other forest reserves in Tanzania is managed by the Tanzania Forest Services (TFS) an agency that controls all the activities taking place in the reserve area.

The major ecosystem found in the Biharamulo Forest Reserve include the dry miombo woodland, savannah woodland patches, open grasslands, and remnants of Guinea-Congo forest in steeper valleys and gullies. The predominant vegeation species in the Biharamulo Forest Reserve include: Brachystegia spp. (miombo trees), Commiphora, Acacia sieberiana, Acacia senegal, Markhamia obtusifolia, and Balanites aegyptiaca.

Mammals include: elephants, buffaloes, hippopotamuses, lions, leopards, and spotted hyenas. Herbirvores include: roan antelope, sable antelope, eland, topi, impala, sitatunga, common reedbuck, steinbuck, zebra, and giraffe. Primates include; Red colobus monkeys, chimpanzees, and aardvarks. Birds include raptors and waterbirds such as martial eagle, sacred ibis, saddle-billed stork, marabou stork, and various herons and ducks, Hornbills, guinea fowl, and localized Zambezian biome species.

Conclusively the conservation ststus of the Biharamulo Forest Reserve is classified under IUCN Category IV (habitat/species management area), the reserve faces local pressures from firewood collection, grazing, and agricultural/settlement encroachment from surrounding growing communities like Nyakanazi.
