= Rostyslav =

Given name

Rostyslav (Ukrainian: Ростислав) is a given name. Notable people with the name include:

- Rostyslav Bahdasarov (1993–2021), Ukrainian footballer
- Rostyslav Dotsenko (1931–2012), Ukrainian translator, literary critic, author of aphorisms and maxims
- Rostyslav Feshchuk (born 1990), alpine skier from Ukraine
- Rostyslav Hertsyk (born 1989), Ukrainian foil fencer
- Rostyslav Horetskyi (born 1979), professional Ukrainian football defender
- Rostyslav I (1110–1167), Prince of Smolensk (1125–1160), Novgorod (1154) and Grand Prince of Kiev (1154–1167)
- Rostyslav II (1173–1214), Prince of Torchesk (1195–1205), Grand Prince of Kiev (1204–1206), Prince of Vyshhorod (1205–1210), Prince of Halych (1207)
- Rostyslav Lazarenko (born 1994), Ukrainian military pilot
- Rostyslav Lyakh (born 2000), professional Ukrainian football midfielder
- Rostyslav Pevtsov (born 1987), Ukrainian-born Azerbaijani triathlete
- Rostyslav Shtyn (born 1957), Ukrainian-Canadian musician, producer of music, film and television projects, entrepreneur
- Rostyslav Sinitsyn (born 1955), ice dancer who competed for the Soviet Union
- Rostyslav Svanidze (1971–2002), Ukrainian swimmer of Georgian descent, specialized in middle-distance freestyle events
- Rostyslav Valikhovski (born 1973), priest, political figure in Ukraine, personal doctor of Ukraine President Yushchenko
- Rostyslav Voloshynovych (born 1991), Ukrainian football midfielder
- Rostyslav Zaulychnyi (born 1968), retired Ukrainian amateur boxer, Olympic medallist

== See also ==
- Rastislav
- Rostislav
- Rostislavich
