= Rostislav (disambiguation) =

Rostislav is a Slavic male given name.

Rostislav may also refer to:

- Russian ship Rostislav (1844), a ship launched in 1844
- Russian battleship Rostislav, a ship launched in 1896
- Prince Rostislav (Rachmaninoff), a symphonic poem by Sergei Rachmaninoff

== See also ==
- Rastislav
