= Rostislav =

- Gender: male

Origin
- Origin: Slavic
- Meaning: rost- ("increase, grow") + -sław/-slav ("glory, fame")

Rostislav is a male Slavic given name, meaning "to increase glory". The feminine counterpart is Rostislava.

== In various languages ==
- Slovak Rastislav
- Bulgarian, Russian: Ростислав (Rostislav), Czech: Rostislav
- Ukrainian: Rostyslav
- Belarusian: Rascislaŭ (roughly pronounced: Ras'-tsi-slaw)
- Polish: Rościsław (roughly pronounced: Ros'-chi-swav)

== People ==
=== Royalty ===
- Rostislav of Tmutarakan (d. 1066)
- Rostislav Vsevolodovich, Prince of Pereyaslavl from 1078 to 1093
- Rostislav I of Kiev, Grand Prince of Kiev from 1154–1167, with intervals
- Rostislav II of Kiev, Grand Prince of Kiev from 1204–1206
- Rostislav III of Kiev, Grand Prince of Kiev in 1239
- Prince Rostislav Alexandrovich of Russia (1902–1978)
- Prince Rostislav Romanov, multiple persons

=== Others ===
- Rostislav Čtvrtlík, Czech actor
- Rostislav Goldshteyn, Russian politician
- Rostislav Olesz (born 1985), Czech hockey player
- Rostislav Shilo (1940–2016), Russian zoo director
- Rostislav Stratimirovich (1683–1688), Bulgarian rebel leader
- Rostislav Vojáček (born 1949), Czech footballer

== See also ==
- Rastko
