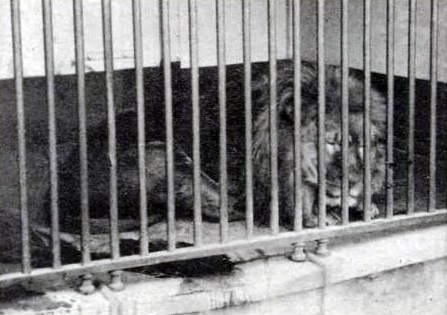
- Male at Jardin des plantes, Paris circa 1860

Scientific classification
- Kingdom: Animalia
- Phylum: Chordata
- Class: Mammalia
- Order: Carnivora
- Family: Felidae
- Genus: Panthera
- Species: P. leo
- Subspecies: P. l. melanochaita
- Population: †Cape lion

= Cape lion =

Extinct lion population in South Africa

The Cape lion was a lion Panthera leo melanochaita population in South Africa's Natal and Cape Provinces which has been locally extinct since the mid-19th century. The type specimen originated at the Cape of Good Hope and was described in 1842.

The Cape lion was once considered a distinct lion subspecies. However, phylogeographic analysis has shown that lion populations in Southern and East Africa are closely related. In 2017, the subspecies Panthera leo melanochaita was recircumscribed to include all lion populations in Southern and East Africa. Genetic analysis published in 2023 suggests that Cape lions were not particularly distinctive from other Southern African lion populations.

== Taxonomy ==
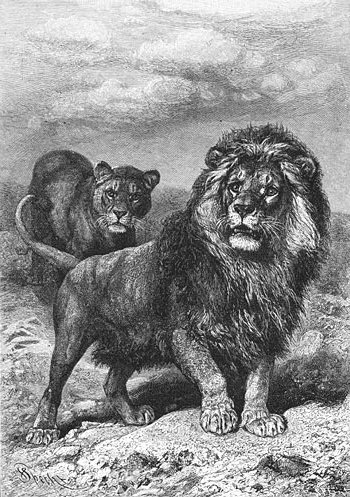
Drawing titled 'Kaapsche Leeuw en Leeuwin (Felis leo capensis)', published in Brehms Tierleben, 1927

Felis (Leo) melanochaita was a black-maned lion specimen from the Cape of Good Hope described by Ch. H. Smith in 1842. In the 19th century, naturalists and hunters recognised it as a distinct subspecies because of this dark mane colour. In the 20th century, some authors supported this view of the Cape lion being a distinct subspecies. Vratislav Mazák hypothesized that it evolved geographically isolated from other populations by the Great Escarpment.

This theory was questioned in the early 21st century. Genetic exchanges between lion populations in the Cape, Kalahari and Transvaal regions, and farther east are considered having been possible through a corridor between the escarpment and the Indian Ocean. Results of phylogeographic studies support this notion of lions in Namibia, Botswana and South Africa being genetically close. Based on the analysis of 357 lion samples from 10 countries, it is thought that lions migrated from Southern to East Africa during the Pleistocene and Holocene. Analysis of 194 lion samples from 22 countries suggest that populations in Southern and East Africa are distinct from populations in West and North Africa and Asia. In 2017, lion populations in Southern and East Africa were subsumed under P. l. melanochaita.

=== Zoological specimens ===
A few natural history museums keep Cape lion specimens in their collections:

- the Transvaal Museum has a female Cape lion skull;
- the Naturalis Biodiversity Center has a mounted specimen and two Cape lion skulls;
- the Natural History Museum, London and the Paris Museum of Natural History each have a mounted Cape lion;
- the Swedish Museum of Natural History has a Cape lion skull, and the Zoological Museum Amsterdam a mounted specimen.
- the African Museum of Dr. Emil Holub in Holice, Czech Republic has a two-year-old stuffed specimen, bought as a small cub in 1876. It was identified as a Cape lion in 2009.

== Characteristics ==
The type specimen of the Cape lion was described as very large with black-edged ears and a black mane extending beyond the shoulders and under the belly. Skulls of two lion specimen in the British Natural History Museum from the Orange River basin were described as a little shorter in the occipital regions than other lions in South Africa and with a tendency to develop the second lower premolar. Its skull is comparatively narrow but longer than those of equatorial lions by at least 25 mm (1.0 in) on average.

Lions approaching 272 kg (600 lb) were shot south of the Vaal River. 19th century authors claimed that the Cape lion was bigger than the Asiatic lion.

Results of a long-term study indicate that the colour of lion manes is influenced by climatic variables and varies between individuals. Manes are darker and longer in cool seasons, with a 2023 study finding that the colour of Cape lion manes exhibited the same dark-light colour variation found in other lions and that mane colour was not a distinctive characteristic of this population.

== Distribution and habitat ==
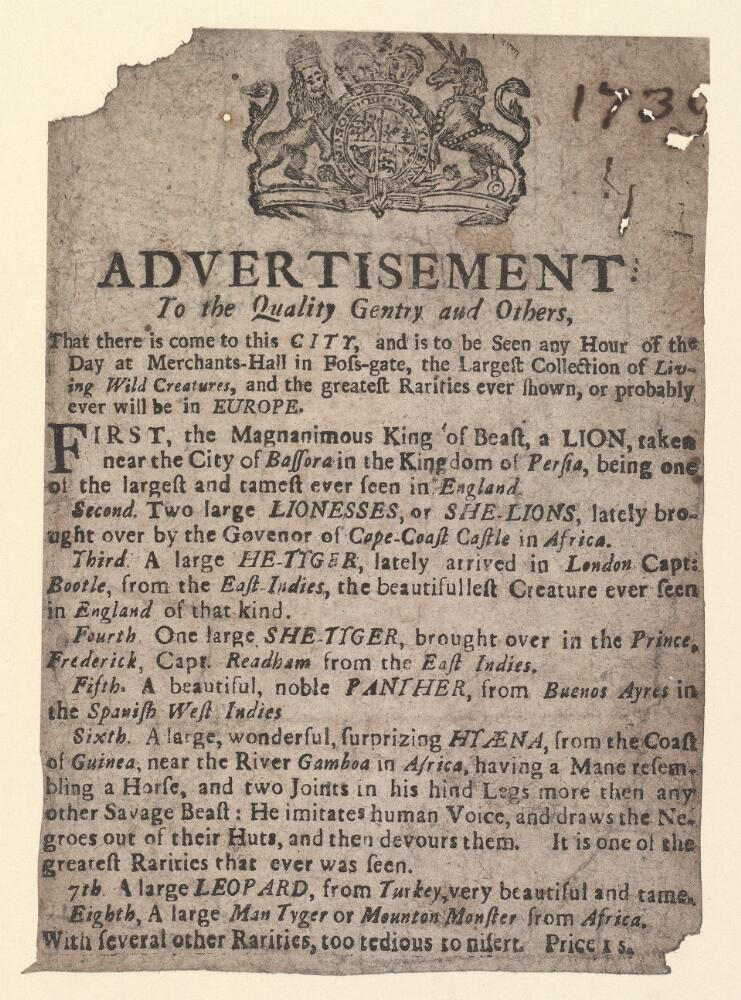
A 1739 advertisement by Charles Benjamin Incledon featuring a Mesopotamian lion from the vicinity of Bassorah, Cape lion, tiger from the East Indies, panther from Buenos Aires, Hyaena hyaena from West Africa, and leopard from Turkey, besides a "Man tyger" from Africa

In the early 19th century, lions still occurred in the Karoo plains and in the Northern Cape. In 1844, lions were sighted south of the Riet River. The last lions south of the Orange River were sighted between 1850 and 1858. In the northern Orange Free State, lions may have survived into the 1860s.

In 2003, six lions from Kgalagadi Transfrontier Park were relocated to Addo Elephant National Park in the Eastern Cape Province.

== In captivity ==
In 2000, specimens asserted to be descendants of the Cape lion were found in captivity in Russia, and two of them were brought to South Africa. South African zoo director John Spence reportedly was long fascinated by stories of these grand lions scaling the walls of Jan van Riebeeck's Fort de Goede Hoop in the 17th century. He studied van Riebeeck's journals to discern the Cape lion's features, which included a long black mane, black in their ears, and reportedly a larger size. He believed that some Cape lions might have been taken to Europe and interbred with other lions. His 30-year search led to his discovery of black-maned lions with features of the Cape lion at the Novosibirsk Zoo in Siberia, in 2000. Besides having a black mane, the specimen that attracted Spence had a "wide face and sturdy legs". Novosibirsk Zoo's population, which had 40 cubs over a 30-year period, continues, and Spence, aided by the Schönbrunn Zoo in Vienna, was allowed to bring two cubs back to Tygerberg Zoo. Back in South Africa, Spence explained that he hoped to breed lions that at least looked like Cape lions, and to have DNA testing done to establish whether or not the cubs were descendants of the original Cape lion. However, Spence died in 2010 and the zoo closed in 2012, with the lions expected to go to Drakenstein Lion Park.

== See also ==
- Asiatic lion
- Barbary lion
- Wild cats in Africa: African leopard · African golden cat · Caracal · Serval · African wildcat · Sand cat · Cheetah · Black-footed cat
