= Rostislavich =

Rostislavich (Ростиславич) is a Russian archaic or colloquial patronymic, literally meaning 'son of Rostislav' (modern official variant, used as the patronymic part of the full Russian name is "Rostislavovich", Ростиславович). Notable people identified by the patronymic include:

- Davyd Rostislavich
- Mstislav Rostislavich of Smolensk (Мстислав Ростиславич Храбрый; c. 1143–1180), knyaz of Novgorod and Smolensk, son of Rostislav Mstislavich (Ростислав Мстиславич) of Smolensk
- Mstislav Rostislavich Bezokii
- Fyodor Rostislavich (Феодор Ростиславич Черный; ?–1298), saint, kniaz of Smolensk and Yaroslavl, son of Rostislav Mstislavich (Ростислав Мстиславич) of Smolensk
- Roman Rostislavich
- Rurik Rostislavich (Рюрик-Василий Ростиславич; ?-1215), Veliky Kniaz of Kiev, son of Veliky Kniaz of Kiev Rostislav Mikhailovich (Ростислав Михайлович), grandson of Vladimir Monomakh
- Volodar Vladimir Rostislavich (Володарь-Владимир Ростиславич) (?–1124), knyaz of Peremyshl, son of Tmutarakan kniaz Rostislav Vladimirovich (Ростислав Владимирович)
- Vasilko Rostislavich (Василько Ростиславович) (10??–11??), knyaz of Terebovl (Теребовль, Требовль), son of Tmutarakan kniaz Rostislav Vladimirovich
- Yaropolk Rostislavich

== See also ==
- Rostislavichi
