= Novosibirsk Zoo =

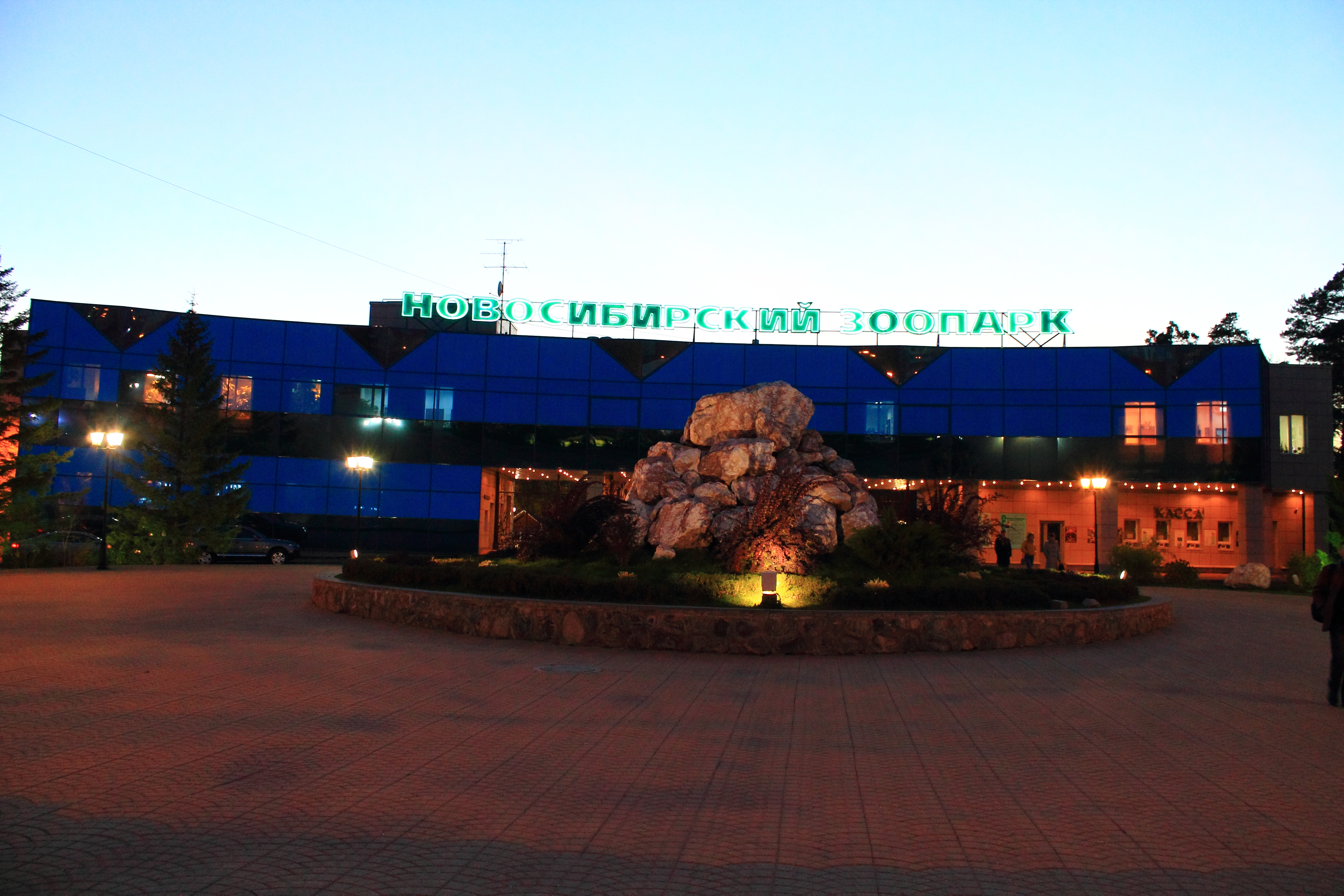
- Interactive map of Novosibirsk Zoo
- 55.056°N 82.880°E
- Location: Novosibirsk, Russia
- Website: www.zoonovosib.ru

The Novosibirsk Zoo named after Rostislav Alexandrovich Shilo (Russian: Новосибирский зоопарк имени Ростислава Александровича Шило, romanized: Novosibirsky zoopark imeni Rostislava Aleksandrovicha Shilo) is a scientific institution as well as a tourist attraction. The zoo has around 11,000 animals representing 738 species and is an active participant in thirty-two different captive breeding programmes for endangered species. On average, over 1,500,000 people visit the zoo each year.

== History ==
The history of Novosibirsk Zoo began with a little zoological garden headed by Maksim Zverev, which was a part of West Siberian Krai Children's Technical and Agricultural Station founded in 1933.

In 1937, the general plan of a development of Novosibirsk was approved. This plan included the establishment of a zoo. The construction was halted due to the Second World War. Only on 29 August 1948, the Novosibirsk Zoo was officially established. It was located on Gogol Street.

The Decree of Council of Ministers of RSFSR №1548 of 15 September 1959 ordered Novosibirsk local authorities to relocate the zoo to new place due to old place's resources for development had been exhausted. But the construction of new zoo began only in 1979 due to difficulties in choosing new place in rapidly growing city.

The zoo's director since 1972 (since 1969 — as interim acting director) until his death in 2016 was Rostislav Shilo. His most significant contribution to the Novosibirsk Zoo development was the relocation to new area in Zayeltsovsky District. This process, began in 1979, took a long time and faced many organizational and financial problems, especially in late 1980s and early 1990s. New zoo opened its doors to its visitors in 1993, but the final relocation was completed in 2005. The new zoo at once became a lovely vacation place for Novosibirsk residents and visitors. Simultaneously with the relocation, the zoo was conducting the extensive scientific research work for a cultivation and preservation of rare animal species.

In 2000, the zoo was found to hold black-maned lions that appeared to be the closest surviving relatives of the extinct Cape lion of South Africa. John Spence, a South African zoo director, had always been fascinated by stories of these grand lions scaling the walls of General van Riebeeck's castle in the 17th century. He believed some Cape lions might have been taken to Europe and interbred with other lions. His search took thirty years, which led him to the Novosibirsk Zoo, where he found the closest living resemblance to the Cape lion; the zoo called the lion Simon. The lion and his family are kept outdoors in large, natural settings. "It is kept all the year around in the climate conditions of the west Siberia at the temperatures from −49 to 36 °C [−56 to 97 °F]. In forty years, more than sixty cubs were born." The Novosibirsk Zoo was able to send two lion cubs to Spence's zoo in South Africa for breeding. Simon's cubs were named after zoo's director Rostislav Shilo and his wife, Olga.

On 1 July 2016, the Novosibirsk Zoo was named after Rostislav Shilo, who died 26 April 2016.

Since 2016, the Center of oceanography and marine biology "Dolphinia" has been part of the zoo.

== Gallery ==
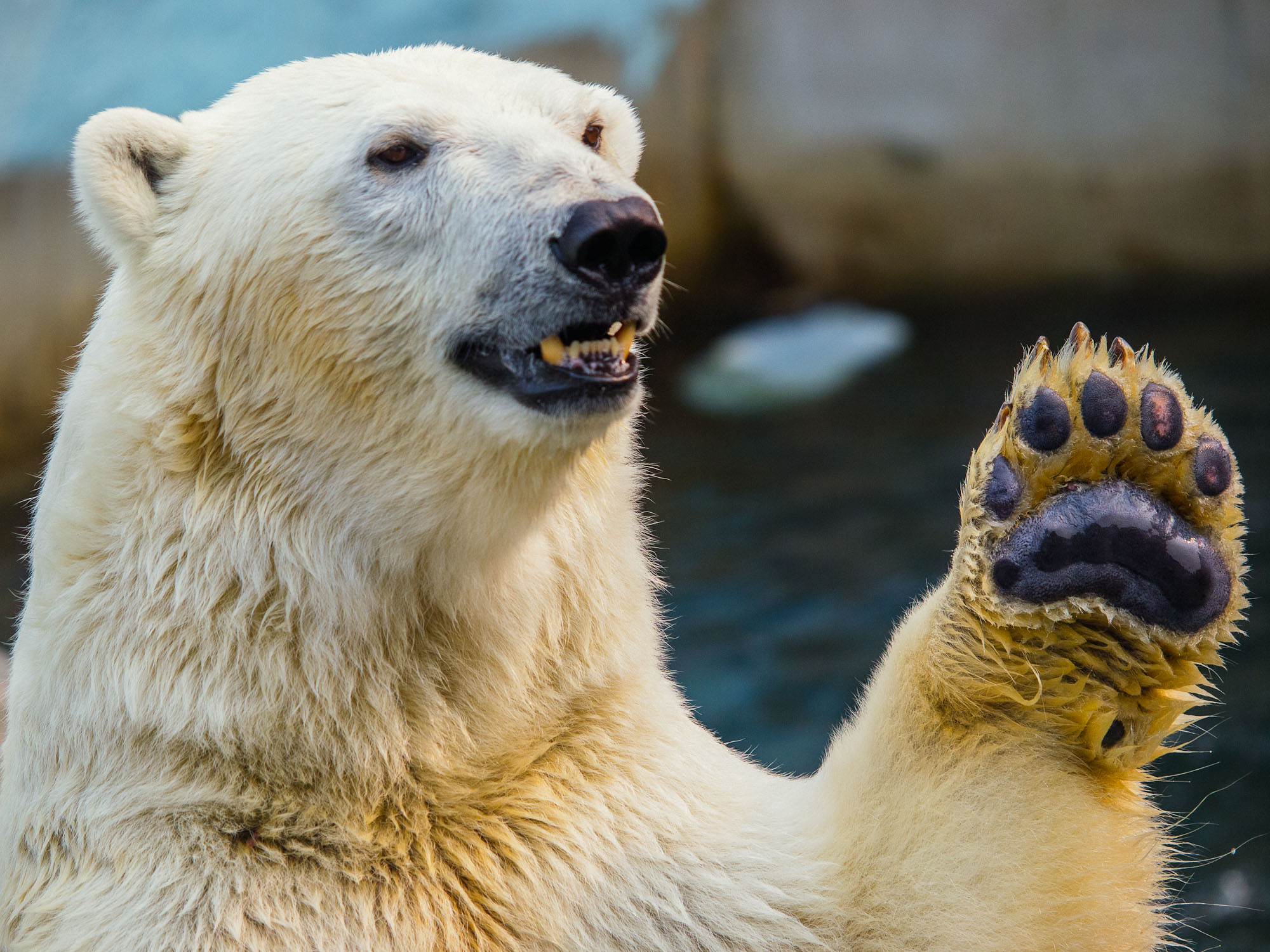
Polar bear

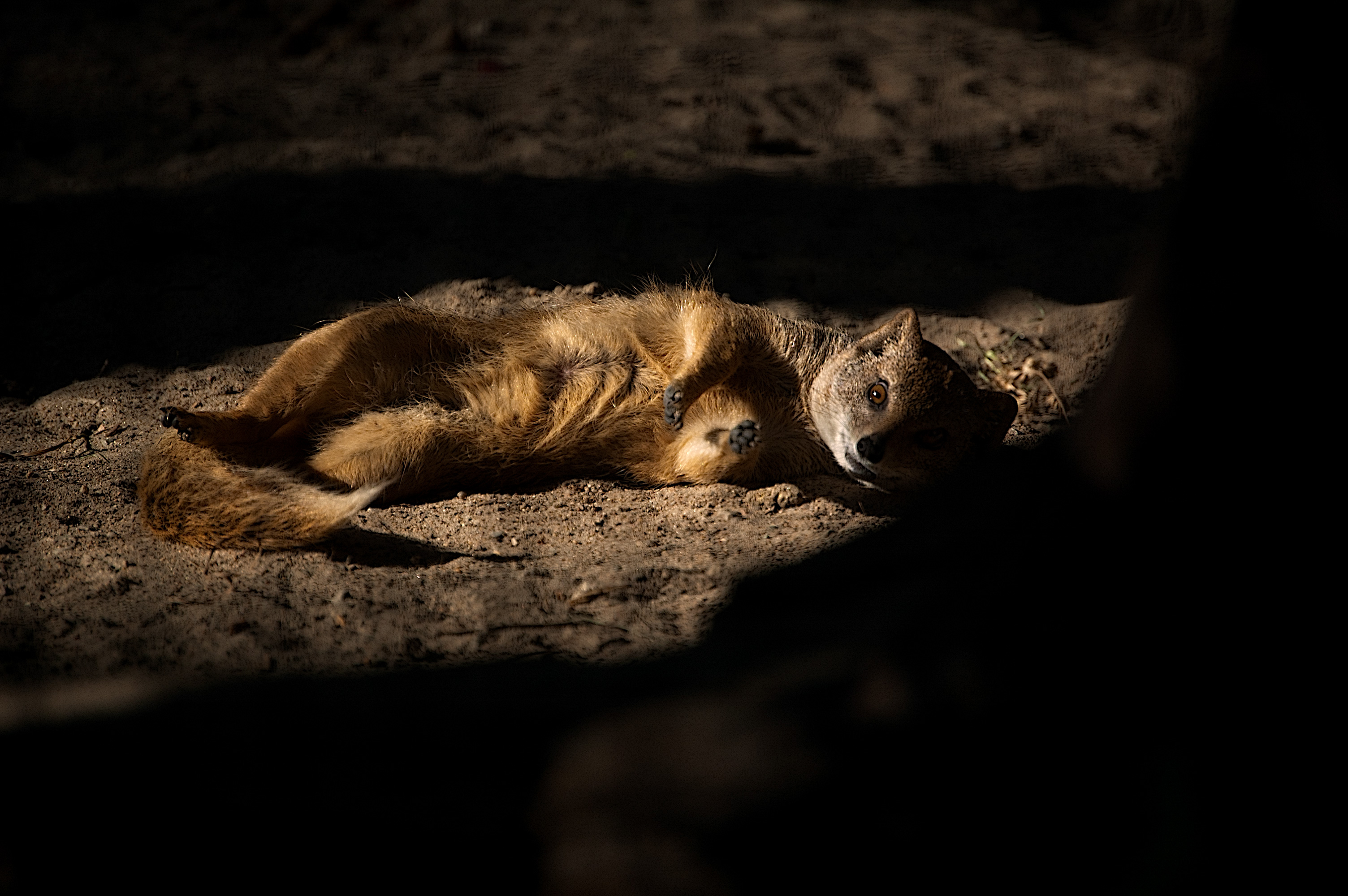
Yellow mongoose

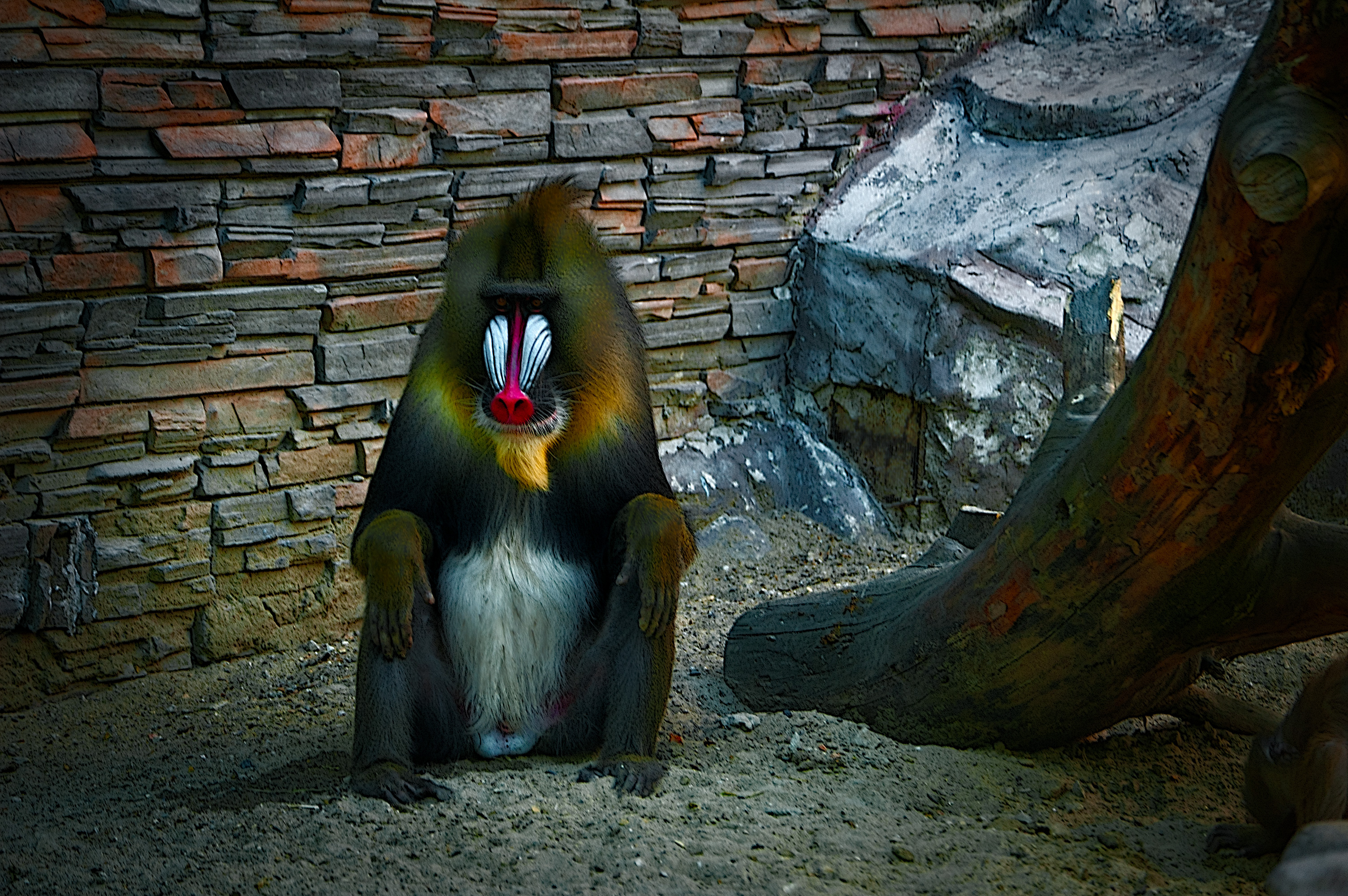
Mandrill

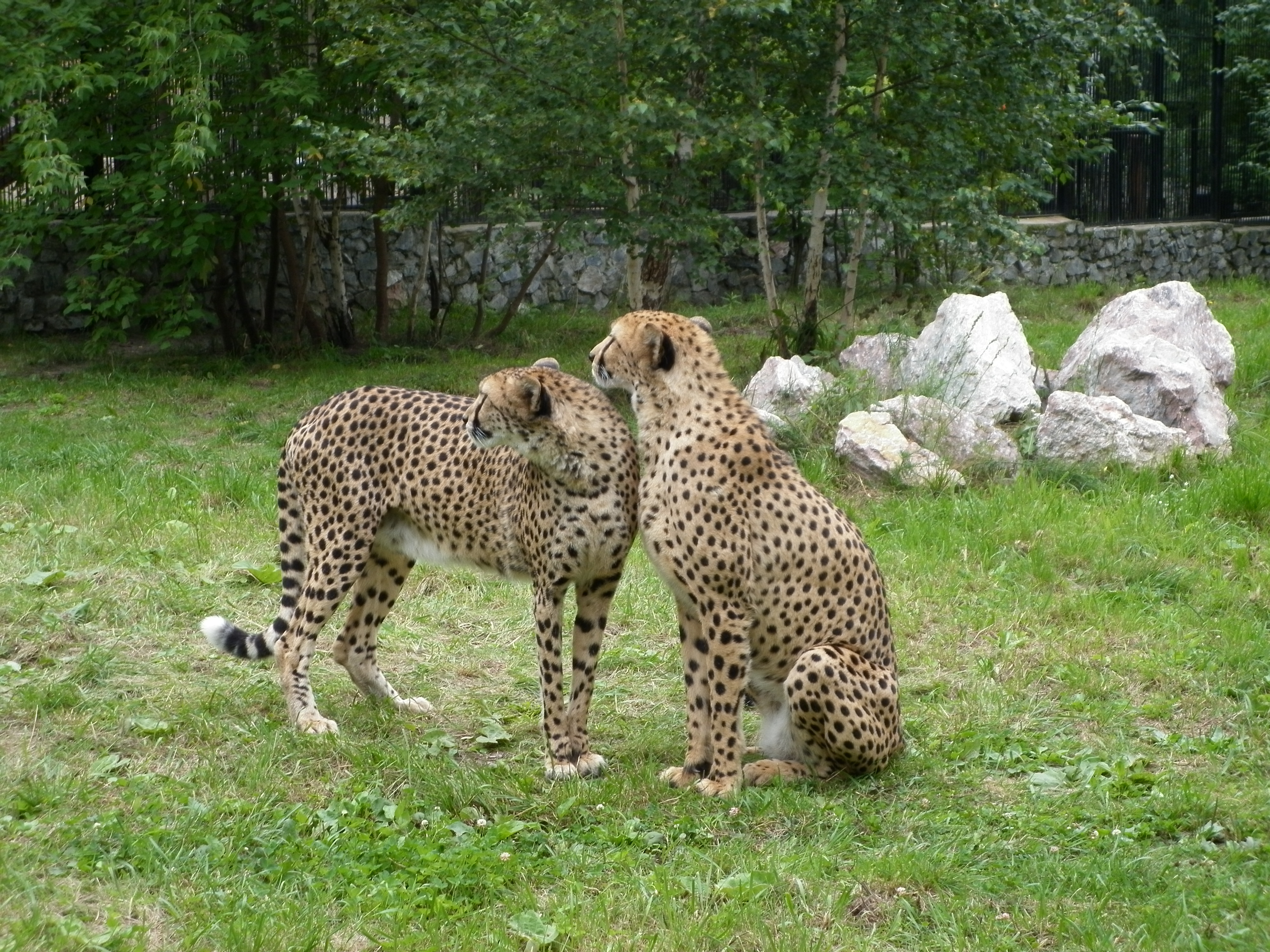
Cheetahs

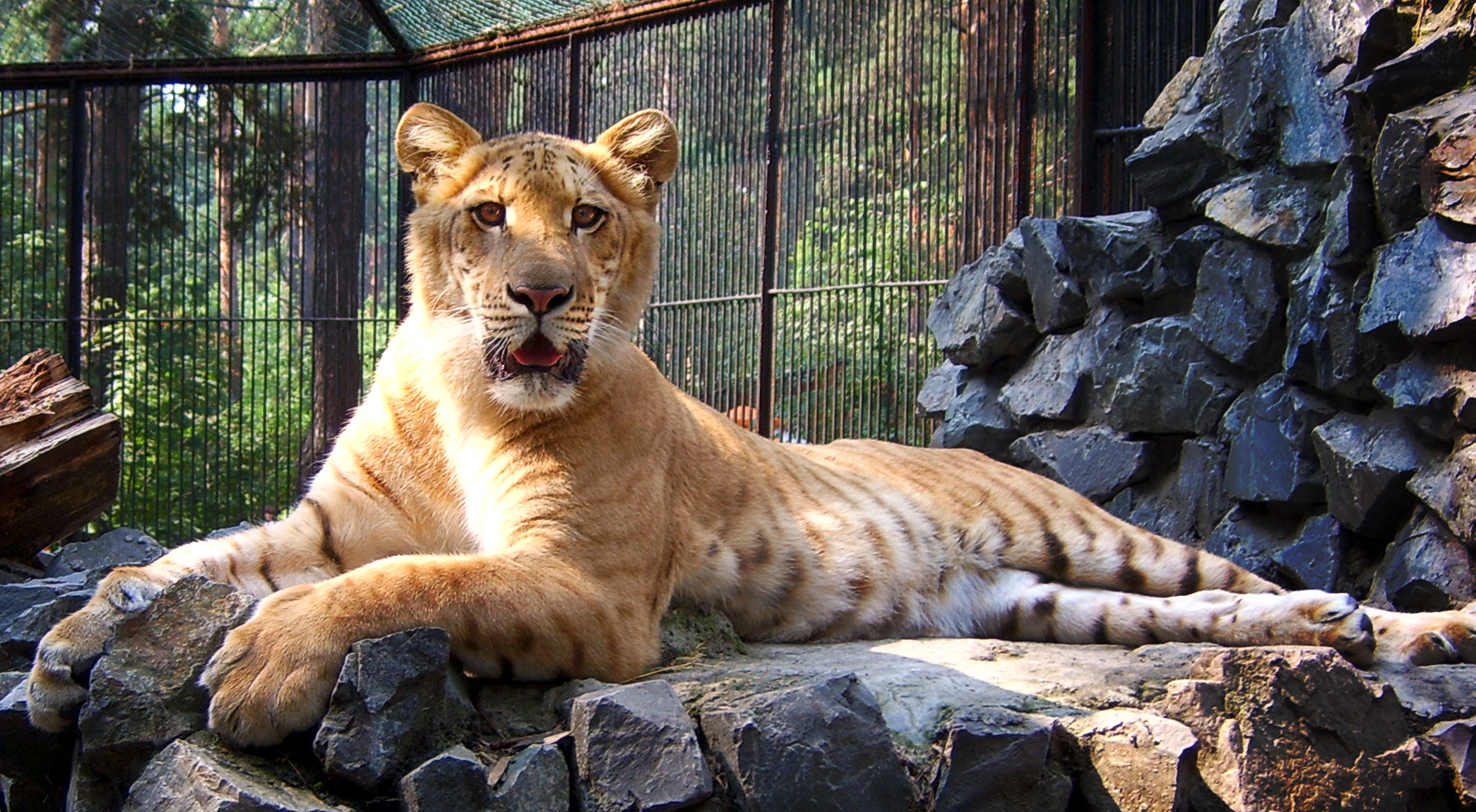
Liger

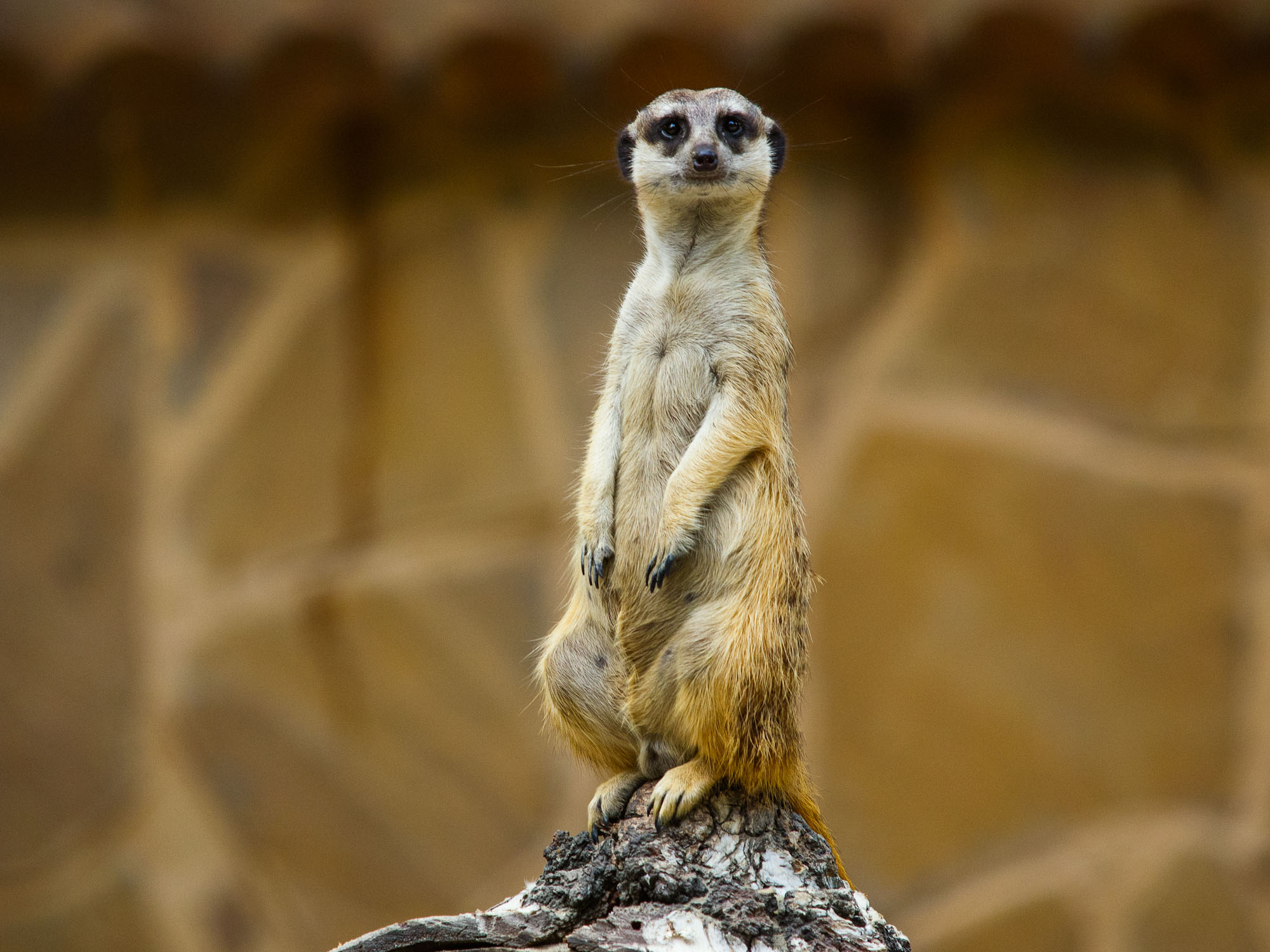
Meerkat

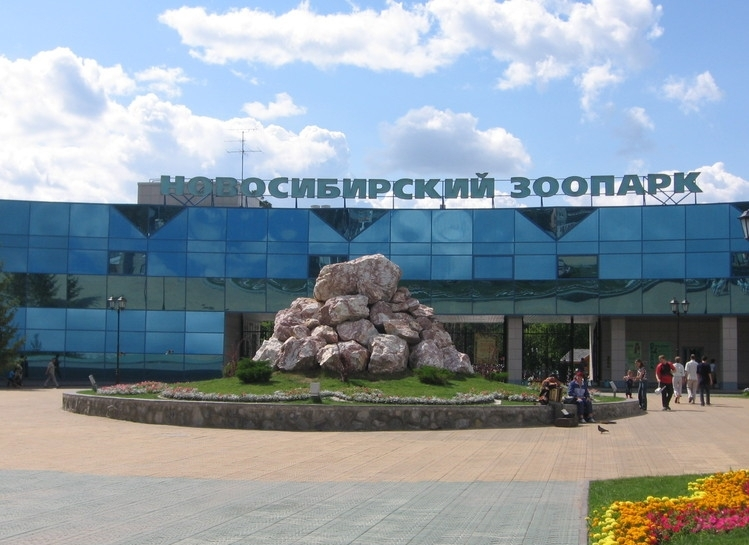

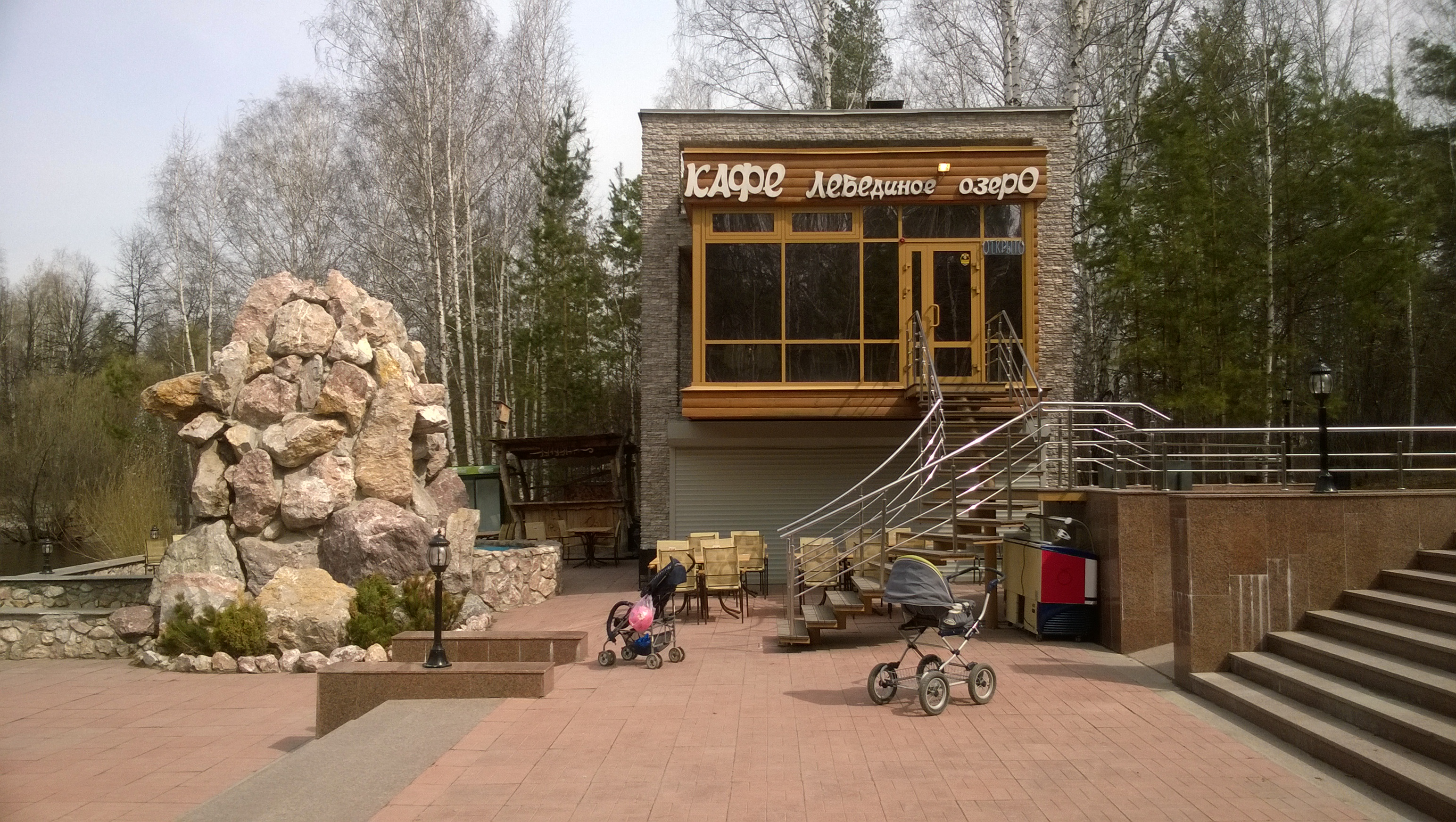

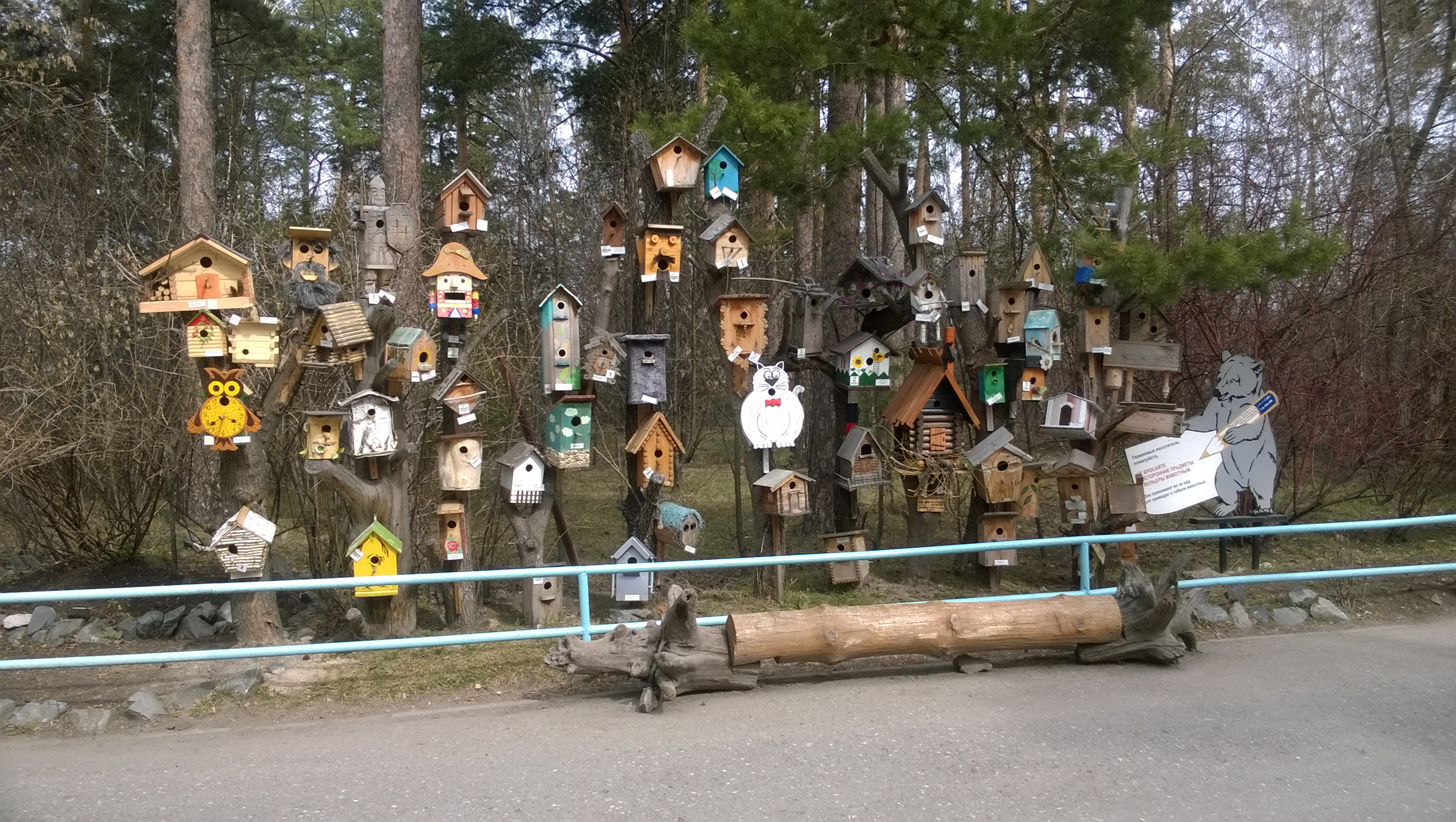

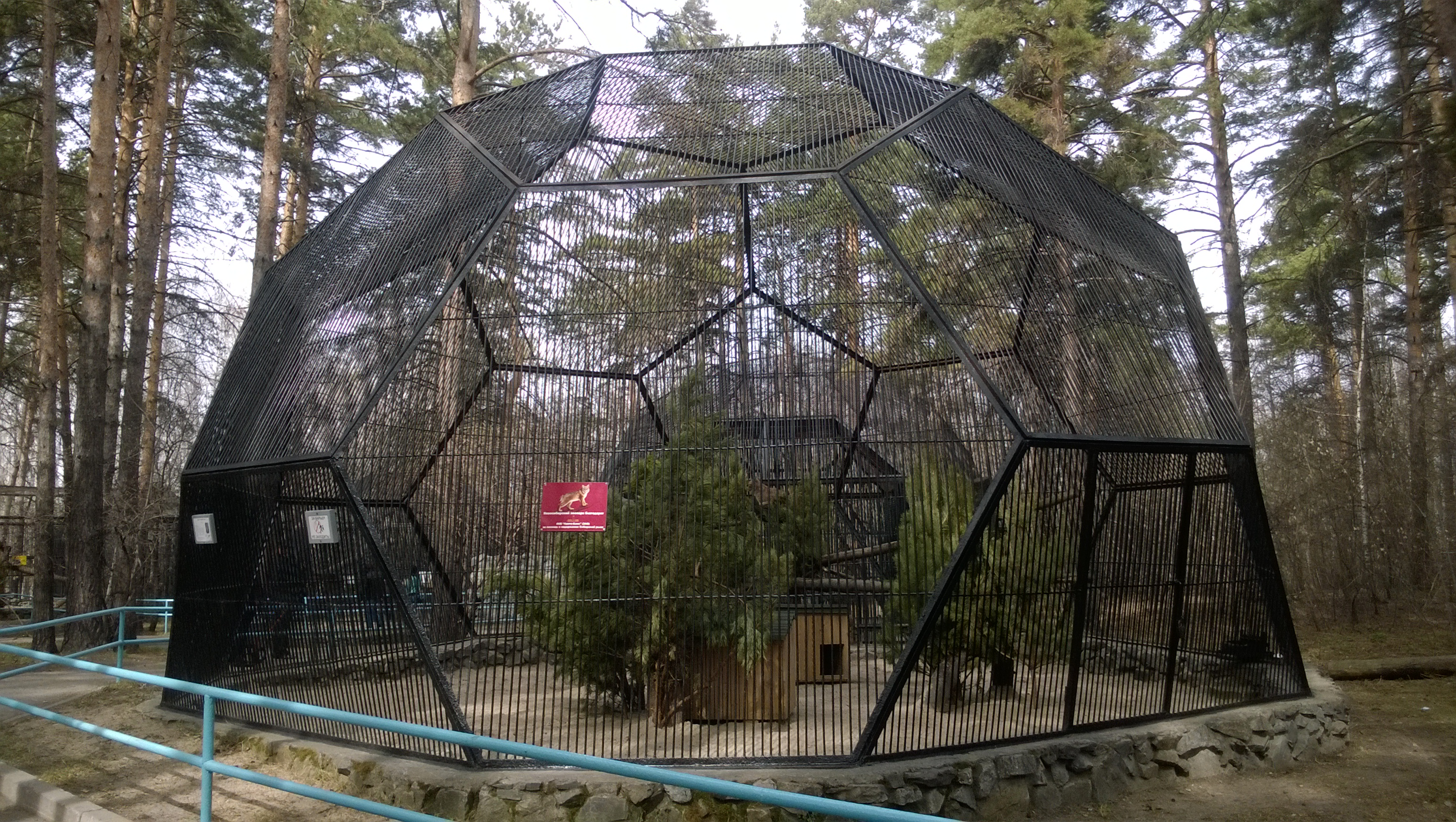

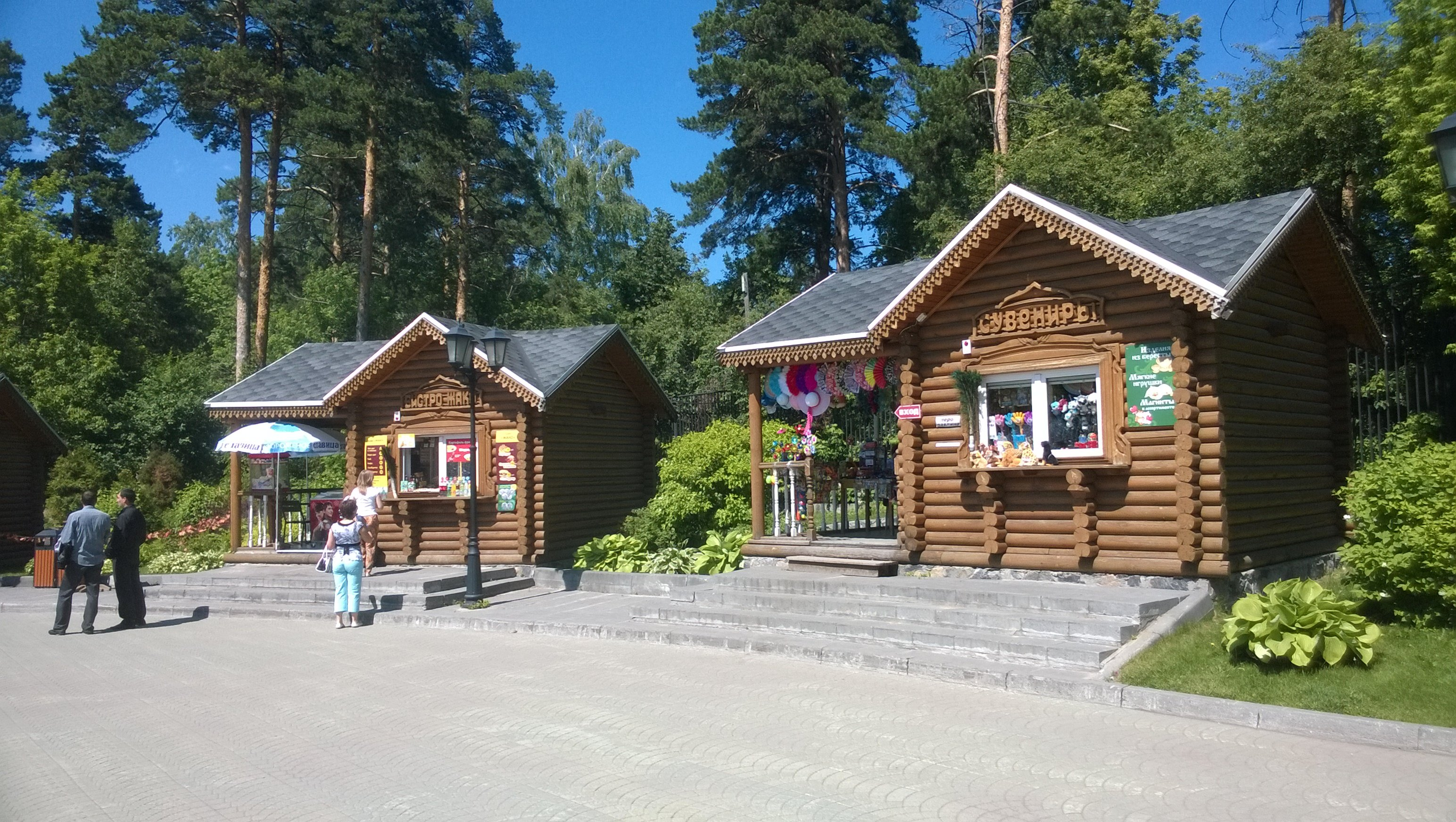

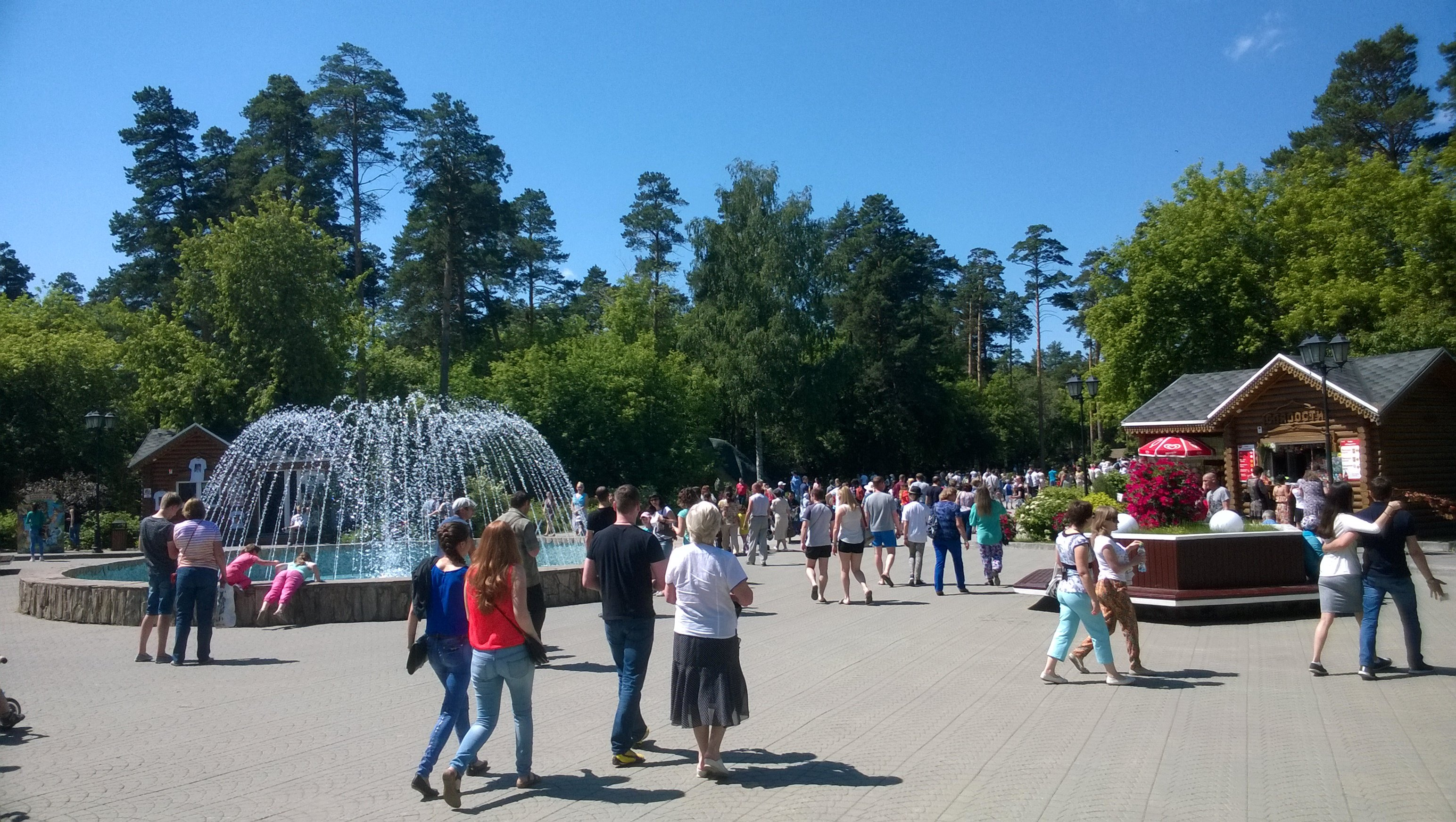

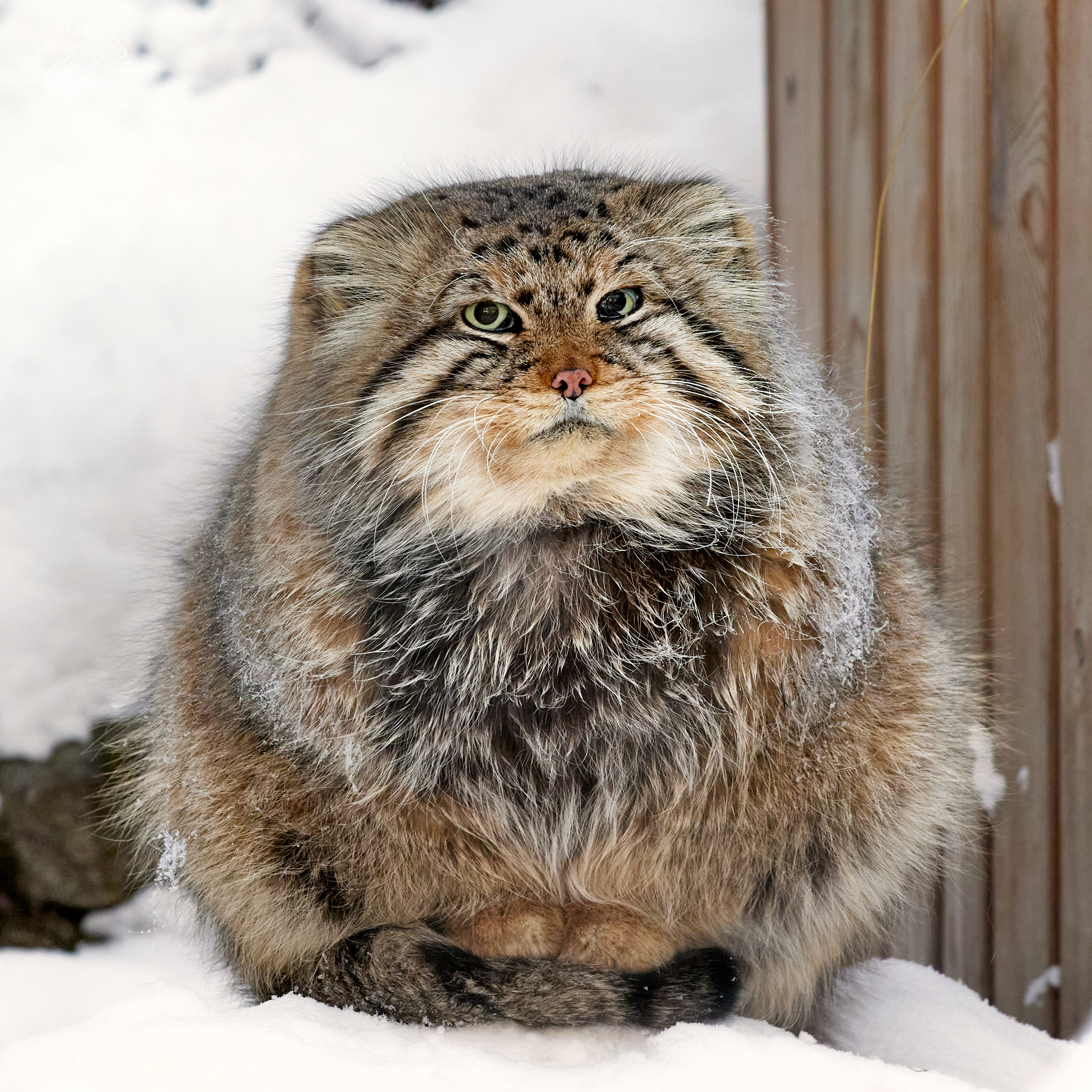
Zelenogorsk, a noted Pallas's cat at the zoo in 2024

== See also ==
- North Asia
- Drakenstein Lion Park
- Tygerberg Zoo
