= Tygerberg Zoo =

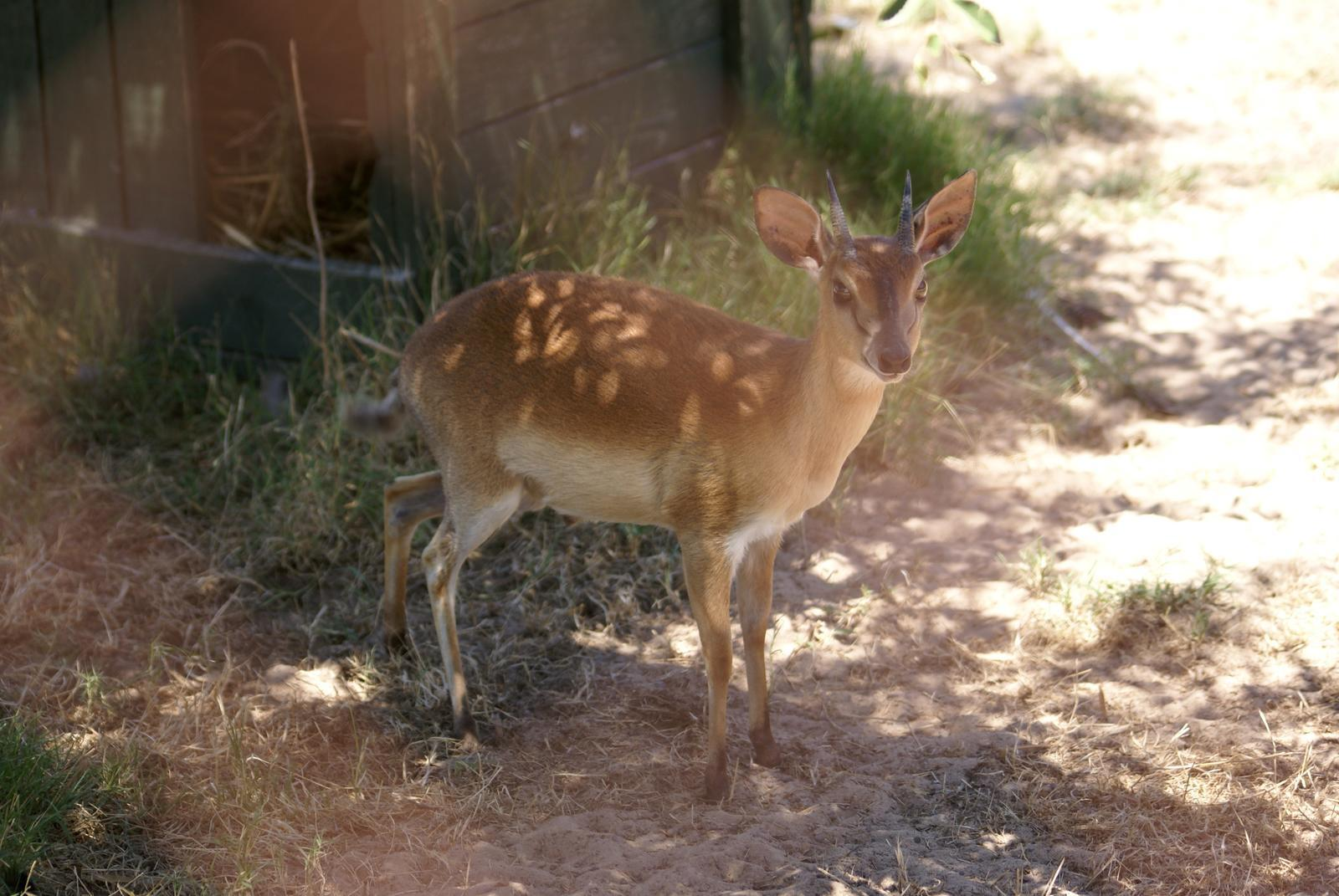
- A suni at the Tygerberg Zoo in 2007
- Interactive map of Tygerberg Zoo
- 33°49′11″S 18°46′40″E
- Date opened: 1979
- Date closed: 2012
- Location: Approx. 40 mi (64 km) from Cape Town, South Africa
- Land area: 24 ha (59 acres)

Tygerberg Zoo was a 24-hectare (59-acre) zoo near Stellenbosch, South Africa, which was the only zoo in the Western Cape province and the closest to Cape Town. Established in 1979, it was privately run, operated for 33 years, and closed in 2012. It was "once a major tourist attraction and a hot spot for school educational outings" according to Cape Times coverage of its closure. Featured animals included chimpanzees and tigers, lions, and cheetahs. The zoo had 160 bird species and 63 reptile species, and "specialised in breeding rare and endangered animals."

The zoo was notable for its breeding successes, including the 1998 birth of "the world's tiniest tortoise", a baby Namaqua speckled.

== History ==
A predecessor zoo was founded by John Spence and Geoff McLachlan at Kraaifontein, just outside Cape Town in 1966. This zoo was soon moved, and at its peak had 61 mammal species and 160 bird species. It addressed a void created by decline and closure of the obsolete Groote Schuur Zoo, established in 1897 and known also as the Cape Town Zoo, that had been designed in a completely different era.

The Tygerberg Zoo was established on its 24-acre property in 1979 by John Spence. Lorraine Spence met John in 1985, and came to the zoo later. John was director before his death in 2010; Lorraine, then director, announced and managed its closing in 2012. The zoo had 24 workers, four of whom lived on the property, in 2012. (Note: According to Gould and Burger the zoo was acquired in 1989 when, under the instruction of supposed "foreign principles", Dr. Wouter Basson, then head of Project Coast, bought the Tygerberg Zoo for the purposes of research into crowd control methods. The zoo, at the time, was owned by Basson's uncle, Cyrus Steyn, and the WPW Group purchased the zoo at a cost of R 711,928. The intention was to generate funds "for the CBW project".)

The zoo's closure in 2012 was, according to Lorraine Spence, due to decline of visitors during its last ten years, and expenses of animal feed and salaries, that made it no longer financially viable. The zoo's animals were to be dispersed to other facilities and to farms. Drakenstein Lion Park, also outside Cape Town, is one sanctuary that did receive many. It purpose-built and opened a modern facility for chimpanzees and small animals from Tygerberg. Drakenstein also was expected to receive Tygerberg's tigers and lions.

Visitation was high on weekends before the scheduled closure. The last day Tygerberg Zoo was to be open for visitors was 4 November 2012.

== Cape lions ==
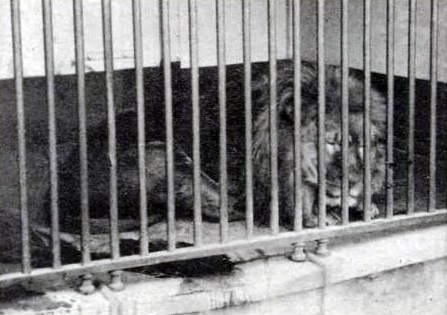
The Cape lion, a distinct subpopulation of the Southern African lion which had a black mane that extended through its belly, and used to live in the Cape Region

The Tygerberg Zoo attracted international attention when John Spence found lions in captivity in Russia, and brought two of them back to the Tygerberg Zoo. They were described in news reports as possible descendants of the extinct Cape lion population.

Cape lions were a black-maned, large, and otherwise distinctive subpopulation of Southern African lions that were native to the Cape region of South Africa. They were hunted to extinction in the wild in the 1850s, and soon believed to have no survivors in captivity. John Spence was long intrigued by stories of Cape lions, including their scaling the walls of Jan van Riebeeck's fort in the 17th century.

Spence believed some Cape lions might have been taken to Europe and interbred with other lions. He spent 30 years searching zoos and circuses world-wide, for lions that looked like Cape lions, until 2000, when a friend sent photographs of lions resembling Cape lions in the Novosibirsk Zoo in Russia. A black-maned lion named Simon, descended from lions which the zoo acquired in 1961, perhaps from a travelling circus, was the best specimen. He was exactly like Cape lions in paintings (the only images available) that Spence had studied. John and Lorraine Spence visited and, with the assistance of a zoo in Vienna, were allowed to bring two of Simon's cubs back to Tygerberg Zoo.

News coverage in 2000–2001 included titles such as the National Geographic News' "Has rare lion of Africa's cape eluded extinction?", for its July 2001 story on Cape lions, and John Spence's long search. Shortly before that, National Geographic Today featured a documentary special on the topic.

Filmed at Tygerberg Zoo in 2001, John Spence explained he hoped to breed lions for the Cape area that looked like Cape lions, but avoided saying the cubs were descendants. He also expressed interest in having DNA-testing done to compare the cubs' DNA to surviving Cape lion DNA, but there are no reports of that having happened.

== See also ==
- Tygerberg
