= Drakenstein Lion Park =

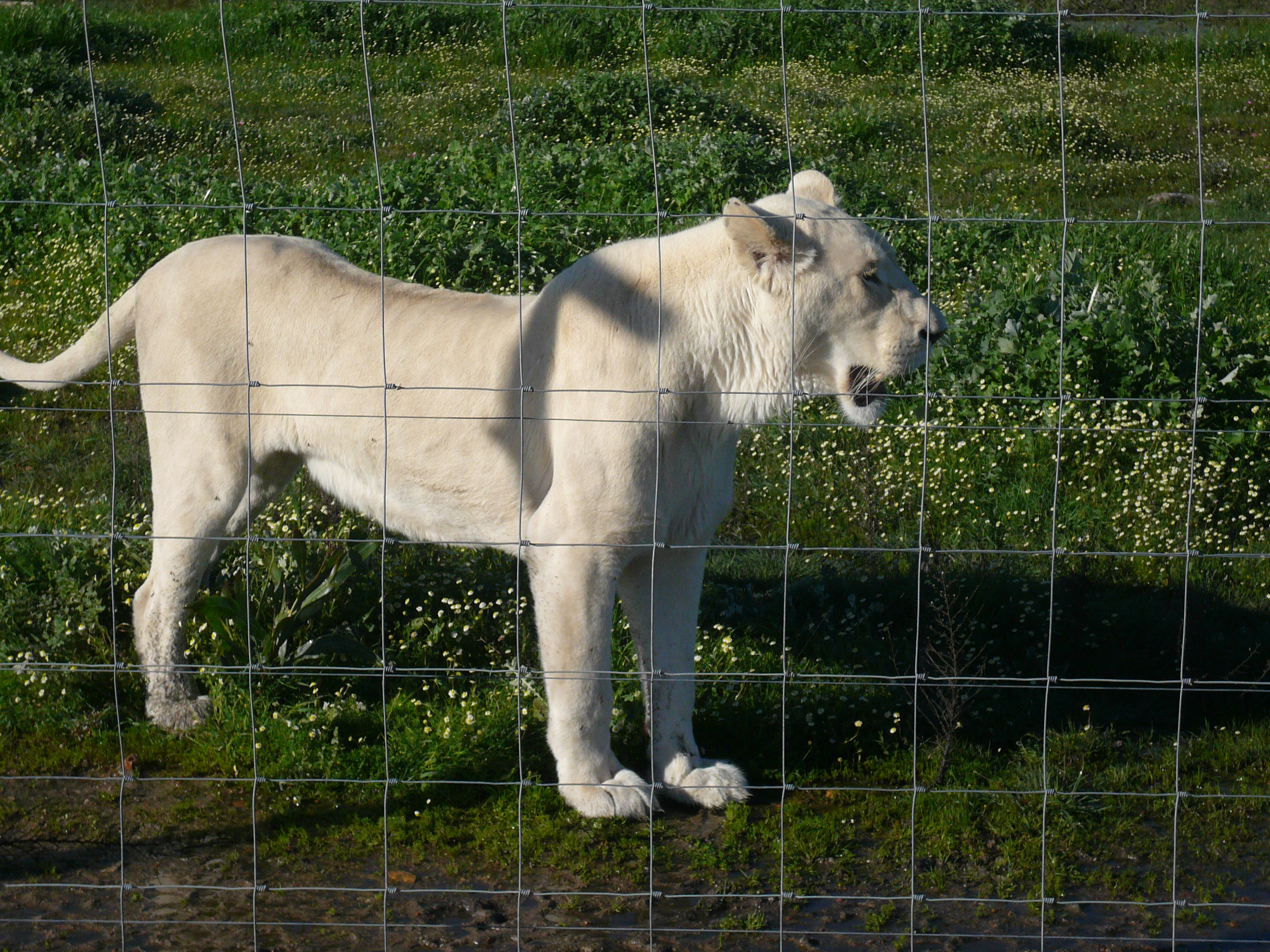
- A white lion at the zoo
- Interactive map of Drakenstein Lion Park
- 33°47′43.38″S 18°54′35.43″E
- Location: Drakenstein, Western Cape, South Africa
- Major exhibits: Lions (particularly Cape and white lions)
- Website: lionrescue.org.za/about-us-2/

Drakenstein Lion Park is a zoological park in Drakenstein, Western Cape, South Africa. It was established in 1998 to keep lions which could not be rehabilitated into the wilderness, and was meant to replace the now-defunct Tygerberg Zoo, which housed possible descendants of the Cape lion, amongst other animals. Other animals included chimpanzees and tigers, including from Novosibirsk Zoo, from where Tygerberg's director John Spence managed to obtain his lions.

== See also ==
- Addis Ababa Lion Zoo
- Rabat Zoo
