= Prince Rostislav Romanov =

Prince Rostislav Romanov may refer to following Russian princes:

- Prince Rostislav Alexandrovich of Russia (1902–1978), son of Grand Duke Alexander Mikhailovich and Xenia Alexandrovna of Russia
- Prince Rostislav Romanov (born 1985), grandson of Prince Rostislav Alexandrovich
