= Rostislav Shilo =

Russian zoo director and zoologist

Rostislav Alexandrovich Shilo
- Born: Ростислав Александрович Шило; 23 October 1940; Dalnerechensk
- Died: 26 April 2016 (aged 75); Novosibirsk
- Occupation: Director of the Novosibirsk Zoo
- Years active: 1972–2016

Rostislav Alexandrovich Shilo (Russian: Ростислав Александрович Шило) (23 October 1940 – 26 April 2016) was a Soviet and Russian public figure, an honoured worker of culture of the RSFSR, a director of the Novosibirsk Zoo (1972–2016), an honorary resident of Novosibirsk and a member of the Novosibirsk city council.

== Biography ==
Rostislav Shilo was born on 23 October 1940 in Dalnerechensk. His father was a biologist. During World War II his family moved to Novosibirsk. In 1961, Shilo graduated from veterinarian vocational school in Kuybyshev and went to work for the Novosibirsk Zoo.

In 1962, Shilo was drafted into the Soviet Armed Forces. He served in radio-technical military unit in the Russian Far East and was demobbed in 1965. After military service, Shilo returned to the Novosibirsk Zoo.

He was soon appointed head of the mammals section and also became a сhairman of the trade union committee. In 1969–1972, Shilo was interim acting director of the Novosibirsk Zoo. In 1972, Shilo was appointed director of the Novosibirsk Zoo, a post he held until his death. In 1975, Shilo graduated from the Novosibirsk Agricultural Institute with a specialist degree in zootechnics.

The most significant contribution of Rostislav Shilo to the Novosibirsk Zoo development was the relocation to a new area in the Zayeltsovsky District. This process, began in 1979, took a long time, and faced many organizational and financial problems, especially in the late 1980s and early 1990s. The new zoo opened its doors to visitors in 1993, but the final relocation was completed in 2005. The zoo at once became a tourist attraction for Novosibirsk residents and visitors. Simultaneously with the relocation, the zoo was conducting the extensive scientific research work for a cultivation and preservation of endangered species. Shilo is the author of 50 scientific works and 9 scientific discoveries.

In 1987, Shilo was awarded the honorary title of “Honoured worker of culture of RSFSR".

Since 2000, Shilo was a member of Novosibirsk's city council.

On 29 June 2007 (Novosibirsk City Day), Shilo became the honorary resident of the city.

Rostislav Shilo died on 26 April 2016 in Meshalkin clinic. He is buried in Zayeltsovskoye Cemetery.

== Family ==
Wife

- Olga Vladimirovna Shilo is a Novosibirsk Zoo employee since 1983.

Children

- Daughter Oksana Rostislavovna Shilo works in music industry.
- Son Andrei Rostislavovich Shilo is the current director of the Novosibirsk Zoo.
- Daughter Tatyana Rostislavovna Shilo works in the Novosibirsk Zoo.

== Legacy ==
- On 1 July 2016, the Novosibirsk Zoo was named after Rostislav Shilo.
- On 4 August 2017, the monument to Rostislav Shilo was opened in Novosibirsk.

== In popular culture ==
Rostislav Shilo was a main focus of the 1981 documentary film "The restless post" (Russian: "Беспокойная должность") by studio "Novosibirkstelefilm".
