= Rastko =

Rastko is a Serbian masculine given name, a diminutive of Rastislav. Notable people with the name include:

- Rastko Nemanjić (1169–1235), known as Saint Sava, the first Patriarch of the Serbian Church
- Rastko Petrović (1898–1949), Serbian poet and writer
- Rastko Poljšak (1899–1994), Slovenian gymnast
- Rastko Ćirić (born 1955), Serbian multimedia artist and educator
- Rastko Cvetković (born 1970), Serbian former professional basketball player
- Rastko Močnik (born 1944), Slovenian sociologist, psychoanalyst, literary theorist, translator, and political activist
- Rastko Stojković (born 1981), Serbian handball player

== See also ==
- Project Rastko — Internet Library of Serb Culture
