= Rostyslav Valikhnovski =

Priest of the Ukrainian Orthodox Church

Rostyslav Liubomyrovych Valikhnovskyi
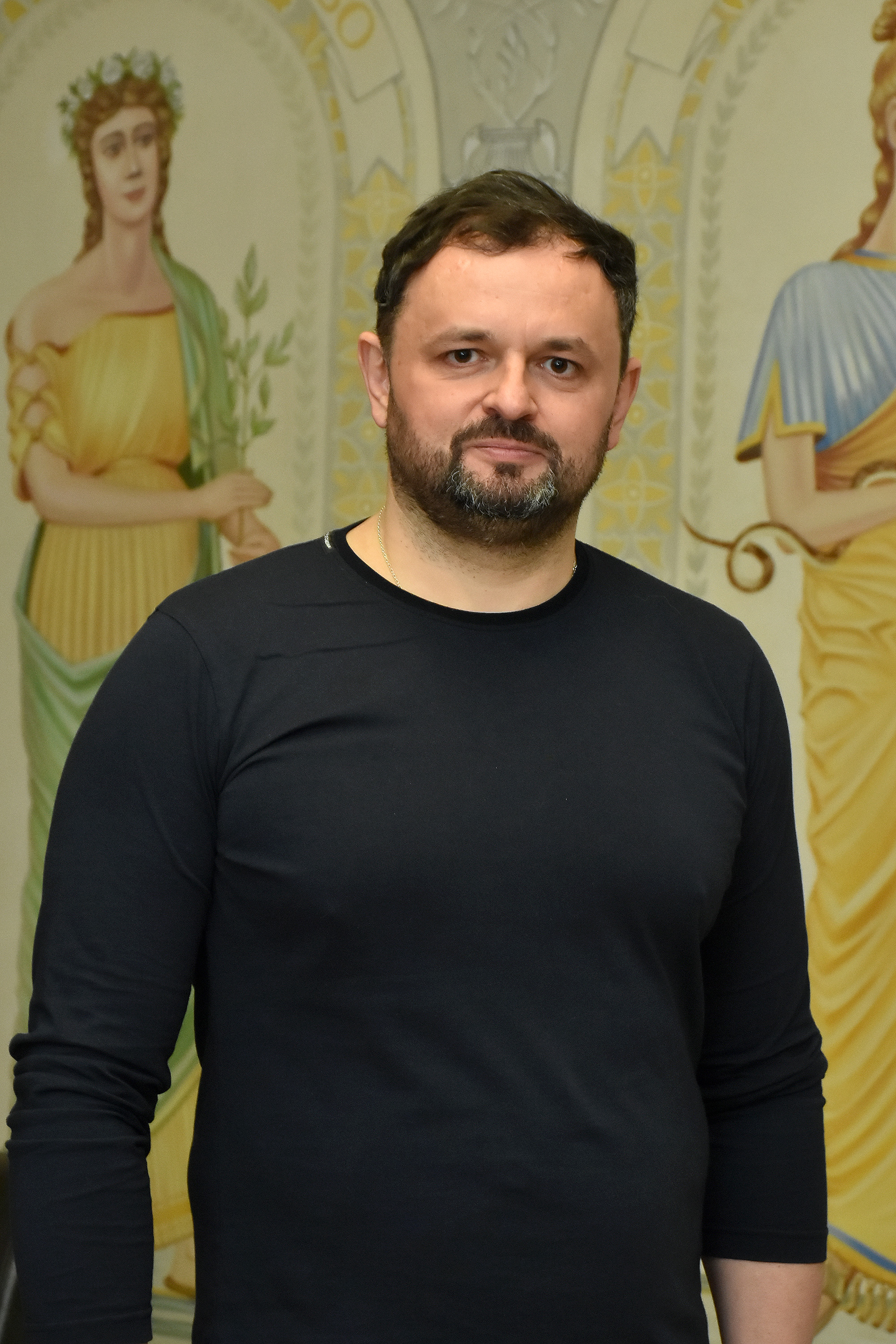
- Rostyslav Valikhnovskyy, February 2017
- Born: 24 February 1973 (age 53); Ivano-Frankivsk, Ukraine
- Citizenship: Ukraine
- Education: Ivan Horbachevsky Ternopil State Medical University
- Occupations: surgeon, physician, priest
- Title: Associate Professor, PhD
- Awards: Honored Doctor of Ukraine
- Website: valikhnovskimd.com

Rostyslav Liubomyrovych Valikhnovskyi (born 24 February 1973, Ivano-Frankivsk, Ukraine) is a Ukrainian surgeon, PhD, associate professor, and Honored Doctor of Ukraine.

From 2008 to 2010, he served as deputy head of the State Administration of Affairs of the President of Ukraine. From 2010 to 2012, he was an adviser to the adviser to the Minister of Emergencies of Ukraine and headed the department responsible for medical support and for the establishment and implementation of the Ministry’s 112 emergency response system.

Since 2004, he has served as the personal physician of President of Ukraine Viktor Yushchenko.

Valikhnovskyi is the founder and director of the Valikhnovski Surgery Institute.

== Biography ==
Valikhnovskyi was born into a family of physicians on 24 February 1973.

In 1990, he graduated with honors from School No. 1 in Turiisk, Volyn Oblast. He subsequently graduated with honors from the Faculty of Medicine of Ternopil Medical Institute. After completing his studies, he undertook further training in Canada.

From 1997 to 1998, he completed an internship in general surgery at the National Institute of Surgery and Transplantology.

From 2005 to 2006, he studied at the Institute of General and Emergency Surgery of the Academy of Medical Sciences of Ukraine in Kharkiv.

In 2006, he defended his Candidate of Medical Sciences dissertation, titled "Rationale for a Surgical and Microsurgical Method for the Treatment of Different Types of Alopecia", and was awarded the degree of Candidate of Medical Sciences in surgery.

He completed specialist training in intensive care at Ottawa Civic Hospital in Canada and in plastic and reconstructive surgery at HFI Clinic in Toronto.

From 2024 to 2026, Valikhnovskyi pursued doctoral studies at the Shupyk National Healthcare University of Ukraine.

== Career ==
In 1998, Valikhnovskyi founded the Valikhnovski Surgery Institute.

In 2004, Valikhnovskyi was selected as a member of the medical team that treated Viktor Yushchenko following his dioxin poisoning. He subsequently became Yushchenko’s personal physician.

From 2008 to 2010, he served as Deputy Head of the State Administration of Affairs of the President of Ukraine.

From 2010 to 2012, he headed the department responsible for medical support and for the establishment and implementation of the Ministry of Emergency Situations of Ukraine's 112 emergency response system.

Since 2012, Valikhnovskyi has headed the Valikhnovski M.D. medical holding company.

== Projects ==
=== Collaboration with Harvard Medical School ===
In 2019, Valikhnovskyi, together with a team of physicians from Massachusetts General Hospital and Harvard Medical School, performed charitable surgical procedures for children with cleft lip.

=== Collaboration with the Discovery channel ===
The Valikhnovski Surgery Institute became a partner of Body Bizarre, a medical documentary television series produced by Discovery Channel. The series, broadcast internationally since 2013, features individuals with rare congenital and acquired physical conditions who undergo reconstructive or plastic surgery. As part of the project, Valikhnovskyi's team treated a patient with Madelung syndrome.

=== Ukraine's 112 Emergency Response System ===
In 2011, while serving at the Ministry of Emergency Situations of Ukraine, Valikhnovskyi led the implementation of the national 112 emergency response system, modeled after the United States' 911 system. He also headed the working group that prepared the draft Law of Ukraine "On the Population Emergency Assistance System Using the Unified Emergency Telephone Number 112" (Draft Law No. 9074 of 26 August 2011), which was subsequently adopted by the Verkhovna Rada of Ukraine.

In 2012, the 112 system operated in Kyiv, Donetsk, Kharkiv, and Lviv oblasts during the UEFA Euro 2012 championship.

=== Treatment of Viktor Yushchenko ===
In September 2004, Viktor Yushchenko was poisoned with 2,3,7,8-tetrachlorodibenzo-p-dioxin (TCDD). Rostyslav Valikhnovskyi was a member of the medical team involved in his treatment and has served as Viktor Yushchenko’s personal physician since 2004.

In 2009, Valikhnovskyi became a co-author of the article "2,3,7,8-Tetrachlorodibenzo-p-dioxin (TCDD) Poisoning in Victor Yushchenko: Identification and Measurement of TCDD Metabolites", published in the medical journal The Lancet. The bibliographic details of the publication are also available in the PubMed database.

Yushchenko’s poisoning is also mentioned in the Netflix documentary series Spycraft, particularly in the episode "Deadly Poisons", which focuses on the use of poisons by intelligence agencies.

=== Kyiv Global Surgery Congress ===
Valikhnovskyi is the founder and organizer of the Kyiv Global Surgery Congress (KGSC), an international surgical congress held in Ukraine. The congress brings together practicing surgeons from multiple countries. In 2017, European surgical protocols and standards were presented in Ukraine for the first time, while Ukrainian surgeons presented their experience in military surgery. English is the official working language of the congress.

=== Television appearances ===
Valikhnovskyi has served as a medical expert on the television programmes Bring Me Beauty Back, Breakfast with 1+1 (1+1), I Am Ashamed of My Body, A Year Later at This Moment (STB), My New Life, Ukraine Speaks (Ukraine), and Concerns Everyone (Inter). He has also provided charitable consultations and surgical treatment for participants in these programmes.

=== Valikhnovski Academy ===
Valikhnovskyi founded the Valikhnovski Academy, an educational platform for medical students, surgical residents, and practicing surgeons. The academy combines live-streamed surgical procedures performed at the Valikhnovski Surgery Institute with educational courses based on internationally recognized surgical training standards and the educational standards of the International Confederation for Plastic, Reconstructive and Aesthetic Surgery (IPRAS).

=== SURGINOMX ===
SURGINOMX is an international educational ecosystem in surgery founded by Valikhnovskyi. The project integrates the Valikhnovski Academy, an educational platform that provides live broadcasts of surgical procedures for medical students and physicians from more than 30 countries.

=== SIMPLYNOMX ===
SIMPLYNOMX is a digital healthcare project developed by Valikhnovskyi. The platform functions as an electronic health record with three-dimensional patient personalization features and is designed to support the digital management of patient care. It is available as a mobile application for iOS and Android.

=== Valikhnovski Surgery Partners ===
Valikhnovski Surgery Partners is a partnership programme for the development of surgical clinics initiated by Valikhnovskyi. The programme is based on partnership agreements with healthcare institutions to expand access to surgical services in regions of Ukraine and internationally.

== Public activity ==
Valikhnovskyi studied at the Kyiv Theological Seminary.

On 22 May 2019, he was ordained as a deacon at St. Nicholas Cathedral of the Pokrovsky Nunnery.

On 19 August 2020, Valikhnovskyi was ordained as a priest.

Following the onset of the full-scale Russian invasion of Ukraine in 2022, Valikhnovskyi has participated in providing medical care to people affected by the war. In particular, he has collaborated with the Territorial Medical Association of the City of Kovel in Volyn Oblast.

On 18 November 2025, Ivan Horbachevsky Ternopil National Medical University established the Rostyslav Valikhnovskyi Scholarship for outstanding students whose parents were killed while defending Ukraine.

== Family ==
- Wife — Kateryna Valikhnovska, a surgical oncologist at the National Cancer Institute and a Doctor of Philosophy (PhD) in Medicine. The couple has a daughter, Mariia.
- Father — Liubomyr Valikhnovskyi, Chief Surgeon of Turiysk, Honored Doctor of Ukraine, with approximately 50 years of surgical experience and more than 35,000 complex surgical procedures performed.
- Mother — Mariia Valikhnovska, Chief Physician in Internal Medicine of Turiysk, Volyn Oblast.
- Grandfather — Dmytro Valikhnovskyi, who served as an Orthodox priest for 64 years.
- Brother — Taras Valikhnovskyi, Chief Physician at the Valikhnovski Surgery Institute.

== Awards ==
- In 2015, Valikhnovskyi was named Person of the Year for the introduction of innovative technologies in medicine.
- From 2016 to 2019, the Valikhnovski Surgery Institute was the winner of the Choice of the Year award in the Best Surgical Clinic of the Year category.
- In 2023, according to the Ukrainian Business Award ranking, the Valikhnovski Surgery Institute was ranked first in the Top 15 Plastic Surgery Clinics in Kyiv category.
- In 2025, the Valikhnovski Surgery Institute received the Clinic of the Year in Plastic Surgery award from the Choice of the Country Analytical Center.
- In 2026, according to the Ukrainian Business Award ranking, the clinic was included in the Top 10 Plastic Surgery Clinics in Kyiv.
- In 2026, Valikhnovskyi was ranked first in the Top 10 Plastic Surgeons of Ukraine by the Ukrainian Business Award.

== Bibliography ==
- R. Valikhnovskyi. The place of the surgical-microsurgical method in the treatment of various types of alopecia. Transplantology 2004. — Vol. 6, No. 2.
- R. Valikhnovskyi. Features of surgical technique in hair microtransplantation. // Transplantology, 2005. — Vol. 8, No. 1.
- R. Valikhnovskyi. Comparative experience of using computer modelling of the results of reconstructive rhinoseptoplasty in patients with acquired nasal defects. // Hospital Surgery, 2009 — No. 4.
- R. Valikhnovskyi. Clinical experience of using dosed dermotension in patients with acquired facial defects // Ukrainian Medical Journal: journal. — 2009. — Vol. X/XI, No. 5(73).
- R. Valikhnovskyi. A modern view on the basic principles of forming a treatment-diagnostic standard in the reconstructive surgery of acquired facial defects — the progressive development of the technical aspect. — 2009. — No. 8(134).
- R. Valikhnovskyi. Comparative effectiveness of methods for treating hypertrophic and keloid facial deformities. // Liky Ukrainy, 2009 —No. 10(136).
- O. Sorg, O. Gaide, J. Sord, M. Zennegg, P. Schmid, R. Fedosyuk, R. Valikhnovskyi, V. Kniazevych. Poisoning of Viktor Yushchenko with 2,3,7,8-tetrachlorodibenzo-p-dioxin (TCDD): identification and quantitative determination of TCDD metabolites. // Liky Ukrainy 2010. — No. 1.
- Valikhnovskyi R. L. Methods of improving treatment outcomes in patients with keloid scars on the face. Clinical Anatomy and Operative Surgery. 2025. Vol. 24, No. 2. P. 20—26. DOI: 10.24061/1727-0847.24.2.2025.20.
- Savoliuk S. I., Valikhnovskyi R. L. Correction of cicatricial deformity of the frontal region: surgical methods and results of own studies. Hospital Surgery. The L. Ya. Kovalchuk Journal. 2025. No. 2. P. 83—89. DOI: 10.11603/2414-4533.2025.2.15396.
- Valikhnovskyi R. L. A clinical case of treating lower-eyelid ectropion with the help of polypropylene mesh materials. Bukovinian Medical Herald. 2025. Vol. 29, No. 2 (114). P. 80—90.
- Valikhnovskyi R. L., Savoliuk S. I., Brodovska N. B. The combination of electrosurgical and laser methods in the treatment of rhinophyma. Clinical and Experimental Pathology. 2025. Vol. 24, No. 2 (92). P. 82—89. DOI: 10.24061/1727-4338.XXIV.2.92.2025.12.
- Valikhnovskyi R. L., Savoliuk S. I. Surgical tactics and treatment results of head neurofibromas: clinical experience. Achievements of Clinical and Experimental Medicine. 2025. No. 3. P. 85—95. DOI: 10.11603/1811-2471.2025.v.i3.15555.
- Valikhnovskyi R. L. The effectiveness of static reconstructive methods in the treatment of prolonged facial nerve paralysis. Hospital Surgery. The L. Ya. Kovalchuk Journal. 2025. No. 3. P. 18—29. DOI: 10.11603/2414-4533.2025.3.15623.
- Valikhnovskyi R. L., Savoliuk S. I. Features of surgical tactics in the reconstruction of the nasal dorsum. Clinical Anatomy and Operative Surgery. 2025. Vol. 24, No. 3. P. 36—42. DOI: 10.24061/1727-0847.24.3.2025.38.
