= Rastislav =

Rastislav is a Slovak masculine given name. The Czech counterpart is Rostislav. Notable people with the name include:

== Politics and religion ==
- Rastislav of Moravia (died 9th century), second ruler of Great Moravia 846–870, saint
- Rastislav of Prešov (born 1978), Slovak Eastern Orthodox bishop
- Rastislav Káčer (born 1965), Slovak diplomat and politician
- Milan Rastislav Štefánik (1880–1919), Slovak politician, diplomat and astronomer

== Sports ==
- Rastislav Bakala (born 1990), Slovak footballer
- Rastislav Beličák (born 1977), Slovak footballer
- Rastislav Bizub (born 1972), Czech swimmer
- Rastislav Božik (born 1977), Slovak football manager
- Rastislav Dej (born 1988), Slovak ice hockey player
- Rastislav Gašpar (born 1994), Slovak ice hockey player
- Rastislav Kružliak (born 1999), Slovak footballer
- Rastislav Kužel (born 1975), Slovak sprint canoeist
- Rastislav Ján Lazorík (born 1973), Slovak footballer
- Rastislav Michalík (born 1974), Slovak footballer
- Rastislav Pavlikovský (born 1977), Slovak ice hockey player
- Rastislav Revúcky (born 1978), Slovak table tennis player
- Rastislav Špirko (born 1984), Slovak ice hockey player
- Rastislav Staňa (born 1980), Slovak ice hockey player
- Rastislav Tomovčík (born 1973), Slovak footballer and manager
- Rastislav Trtík (1961–2024), Czech handball player and coach
- Rastislav Tureček (born 1972), Slovak Paralympic cyclist
- Rastislav Václavik (born 1997), Slovak footballer
- Rastislav Veselko (born 1988), Slovak ice hockey player
- Rastislav Vnučko (born 1975), Slovak figure skater

== See also ==
- Rastislalić family, 14th-century Serbian noble family
- Rastko
