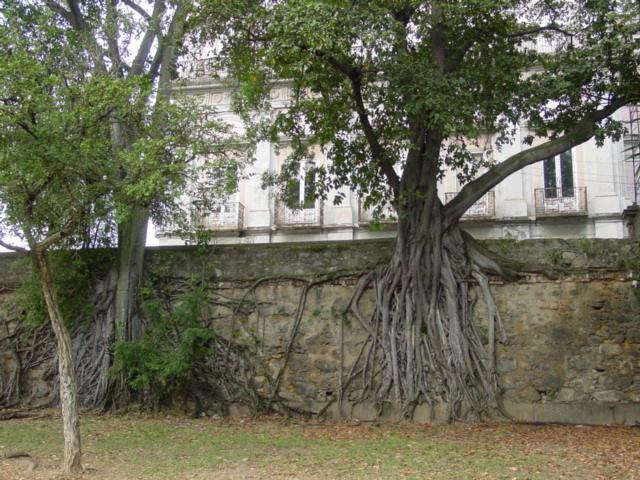

Conservation status
- Least Concern (IUCN 3.1)

Scientific classification
- Kingdom: Plantae
- Clade: Tracheophytes
- Clade: Angiosperms
- Clade: Eudicots
- Clade: Rosids
- Order: Rosales
- Family: Moraceae
- Genus: Ficus
- Subgenus: F. subg. Urostigma
- Species: F. americana

Binomial name
- Ficus americana Aubl. 1775, conserved name

Subspecies
- Ficus americana subsp. americana; Ficus americana subsp. andicola (Standl.) C.C.Berg; Ficus americana subsp. greiffiana (Dugand) C.C.Berg

Synonyms
- synonyms of subsp. americana: Ficus arbutifolia Link; Ficus chiriquiana (Miq.) Miq.; Ficus consanguinea Kunth & C.D.Bouché; Ficus eugeniifolia (Liebm.) Hemsl.; Ficus fadyenii Miq.; Ficus georgii Standl. & L.O.Williams; Ficus jacquiniifolia A.Rich.; Ficus liebmanniana (Miq.) Miq.; Ficus oerstediana (Miq.) Miq.; Ficus omphalophora Warb.; Ficus perforata L.; Ficus periplocifolia Kunth & C.D.Bouché; Ficus sintenisii Warb.; Ficus wilsonii Warb.; Urostigma chiriquianum Miq.; Urostigma consanguineum (Kunth & C.D.Bouché) Miq.; Urostigma eugeniifolium Liebm.; Urostigma liebmannianum Miq.; Urostigma oerstedianum Miq.; synonyms of subsp. andicola: Ficus andicola Standl.

= Ficus americana =

Species of fig tree native to the Neotropics

Ficus americana, commonly known as the West Indian laurel fig or Jamaican cherry fig, is a tree in the family Moraceae which is native to Florida, the Caribbean, and Mexico in the north, through Central and South America south to central Brazil. The species is variable; the five recognised subspecies were previously placed in a large number of other species.

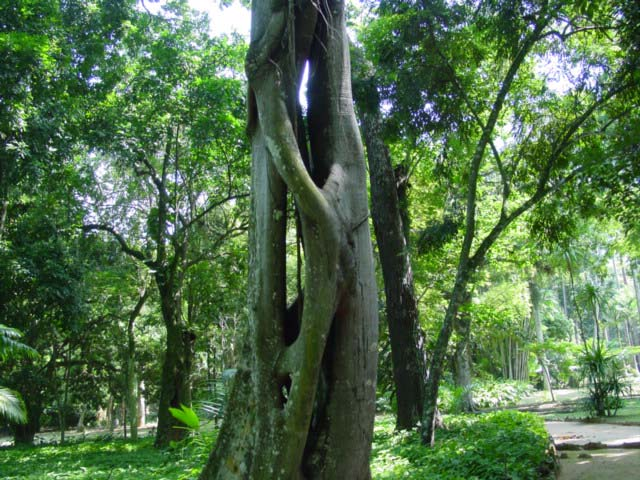
Ficus americana at Rio de Janeiro Botanical Garden

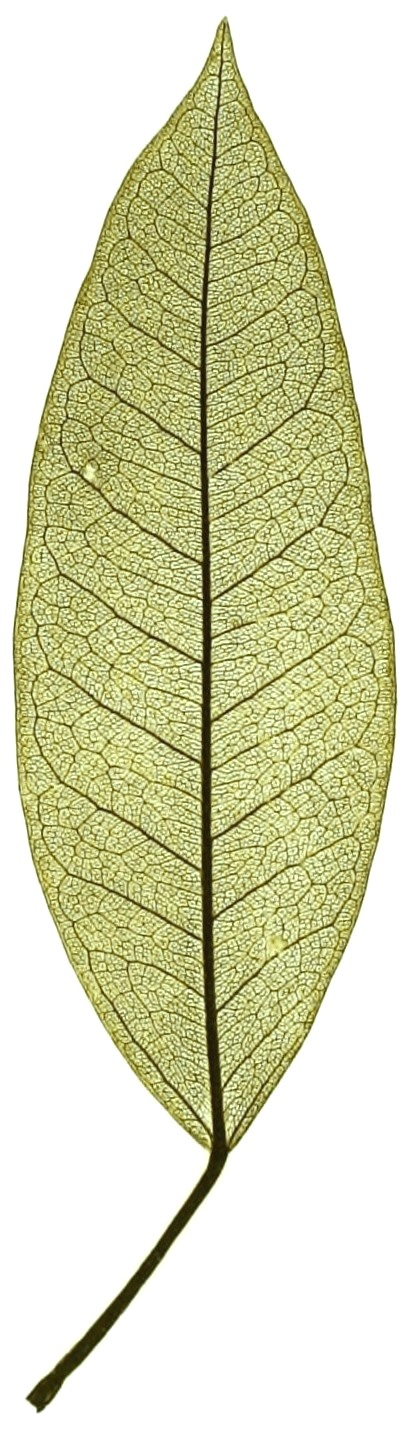
Nature printed leaf, showing shape and venation

== Description ==
Ficus americana is a shrub or tree which grows up to 30 m (100 ft) tall.

== Taxonomy ==
With about 750 species, Ficus (Moraceae) is one of the largest angiosperm genera (ranked the 31st largest by David Frodin of Chelsea Physic Garden). Ficus americana is classified in the subgenus Urostigma (the strangler figs) and the section Americana. Recent molecular phylogenies have shown that subgenus Urostigma is polyphyletic, but have strongly supported the validity of section Americana as a discrete group (although its exact relationship to section Galoglychia is unclear).

Both Aublet and Linnaeus published descriptions of this species in 1775, basing them on an illustration of Charles Plumier's published posthumously in Plantarum americanarum, quas olim Carolus Plumierus detexit (Amsterdam, 1755–1760). There is uncertainty was to which version was published first; since the first-published description has priority, there was confusion as to which was the proper name for the species—F. americana Aubl. or F. perforata L. To resolve this, Cornelis Berg proposed in 2003 that Aublet's name be conserved over Linnaeus', since it was more widely used. This proposal was accepted "after lengthy discussion".

In 2007 Cornelis Christiaan Berg proposed five subspecies: F. americana Aubl. subsp. americana, F. americana Aubl. subsp. andicola (Standl.) C.C. Berg, F. americana Aubl. subsp. greiffiana (Dugand) C.C. Berg, F. americana Aubl. subsp. guianensis (Desv.) C.C. Berg, and F. americana Aubl. subsp. subapiculata (Miq.) C.C. Berg. As of February 2026 Plants of the World Online accepts three subspecies – subsp. americana, subsp. andicola, and subsp. greiffiana – and treats Ficus guianensis and Ficus subapiculata as distinct species rather than subspecies of F. americana.

== Reproduction ==
Figs have an obligate mutualism with fig wasp (Agaonidae); figs are only pollinated by fig wasps, and fig wasps can only reproduce in fig flowers. Generally, each fig species depends on a single species of wasp for pollination. The wasps are similarly dependent on their fig species in order to reproduce.

Figs in section Americana of subgenus Urostigma are pollinated by wasps in the genus Pegoscapus. Pegoscapus clusiifolidis was described from Ficus clusiifolia (a synonym of F. americana). Another study refers to P. insularis as the pollinator of F. perforata (another synonym of F. americana). That study also found that P. insularis represented a cryptic species complex.

== Distribution ==
Ficus americana is found throughout the Caribbean, from the Bahamas south to Trinidad and Tobago. It occurs in Mexico, Guatemala, Belize, Honduras, Nicaragua, El Salvador, Costa Rica, Panama, Colombia, Venezuela, Guyana, Suriname, Ecuador, Peru, Bolivia and Brazil. It has been introduced to Florida, USA and has escaped from cultivation in Miami-Dade County.

== Ecology ==
Figs are sometimes considered to be potential keystone species in communities of fruit-eating animals; their asynchronous fruiting patterns may cause them to be important fruit sources when other food sources are scarce. At Tinigua National Park in Colombia Ficus americana was an important fruit producer during periods of fruit scarcity in two of three years. This led Colombian ecologist Pablo Stevens to consider it a potential keystone species at that site.

The interaction between figs and fig wasps is especially well-known (see section on reproduction, above). In addition to their pollinators, Ficus species are exploited by a group of non-pollinating chalcidoid wasps whose larvae develop in its figs. Both pollinating and non-pollinating wasps serve as hosts for parasitoid wasps. In addition to Pegoscapus pollinators, non-pollinating wasps belonging to the genera Heterandrium, Aepocerus and Idarnes were found in F. americana figs in Brazil.
