= Breeding programs at Zoo Basel =

Zoo Basel
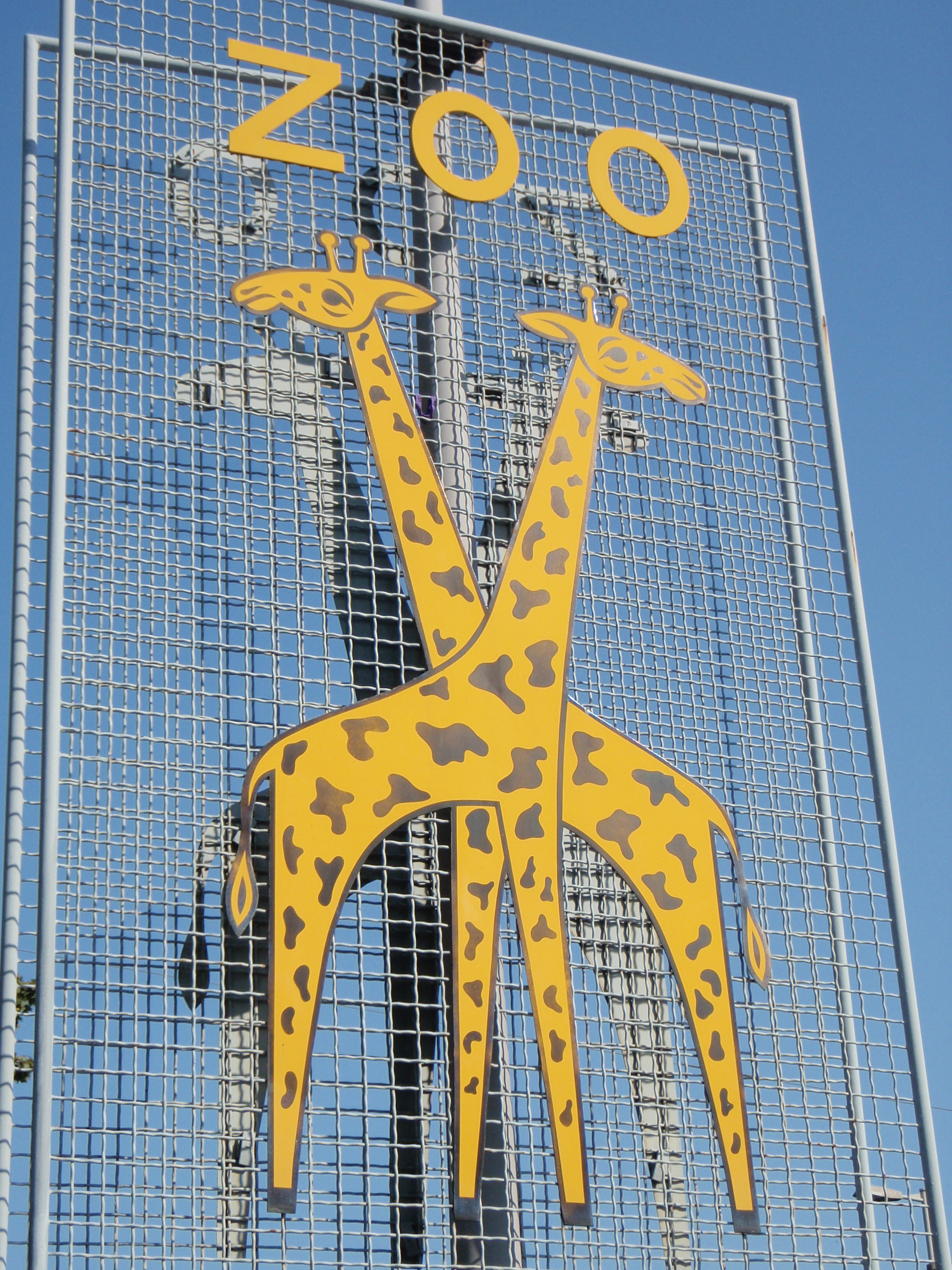
- Zoo Basel logo
- Date opened: July 3, 1874
- Location: Basel, Switzerland
- Land area: 32.12 acres (13.00 ha)
- No. of animals: 6,894 (2008 – about 5,000 in the aquarium)
- No. of species: 645 (2008)
- Memberships: 20 different organizations – among others: Association of Zoos and Aquariums
- Website: www.zoobasel.ch

The breeding programs at Zoo Basel have had many highlights since the zoo's opening in 1874. These include the worldwide first zoo births of an Indian rhinoceros and greater flamingo hatch, as well as the first European gorilla birth. Due to Zoo Basel's successful breeding programs, it manages the international studbook for the Indian rhinoceros and the pygmy hippopotamus, as well as several European studbooks.

== General information ==
The zoo is a member of the World Association of Zoos and Aquariums (WAZA), the European Endangered Species Programme (EEP), and 18 other programs and organizations. In 1935, the forerunner of the WAZA (the International Union of Directors of Zoological Gardens or IUDZG) was founded in Basel.

=== Breeding program participations ===
Among the breeding programs for endangered species that the Zoo Basel participates in are:

- African wild dog
- Cheetah
- European otter
- Golden lion tamarin
- Indian rhinoceros
- Okapi
- Pygmy hippopotamus
- Squirrel monkey
- Snow leopard
- Somali wild ass

=== Studbook overview ===
Zoo Basel is a member of the World Association of Zoos and Aquariums (WAZA) and the European Endangered Species Programme (EEP) and holds following studbooks:

Animal	Image	Years	Which Studbook(-s)	Animal in Basel
Indian rhinoceros		1972–present	International studbook for the Indian rhinoceros	since 1952
Pygmy hippopotamus		1975–present	International studbook for the pygmy hippopotamus	1928-2004 2008–present
Indian rhinoceros		1990–present	Indian rhinoceros studbook of the European Endangered Species Programme	since 1952
Somali wild ass		n/a -present	Somali wild ass studbook of the European Endangered Species Programme	since 1970
Lesser kudu		2010–present	European Endangered Species Programme	since 1956

== Cheetahs ==
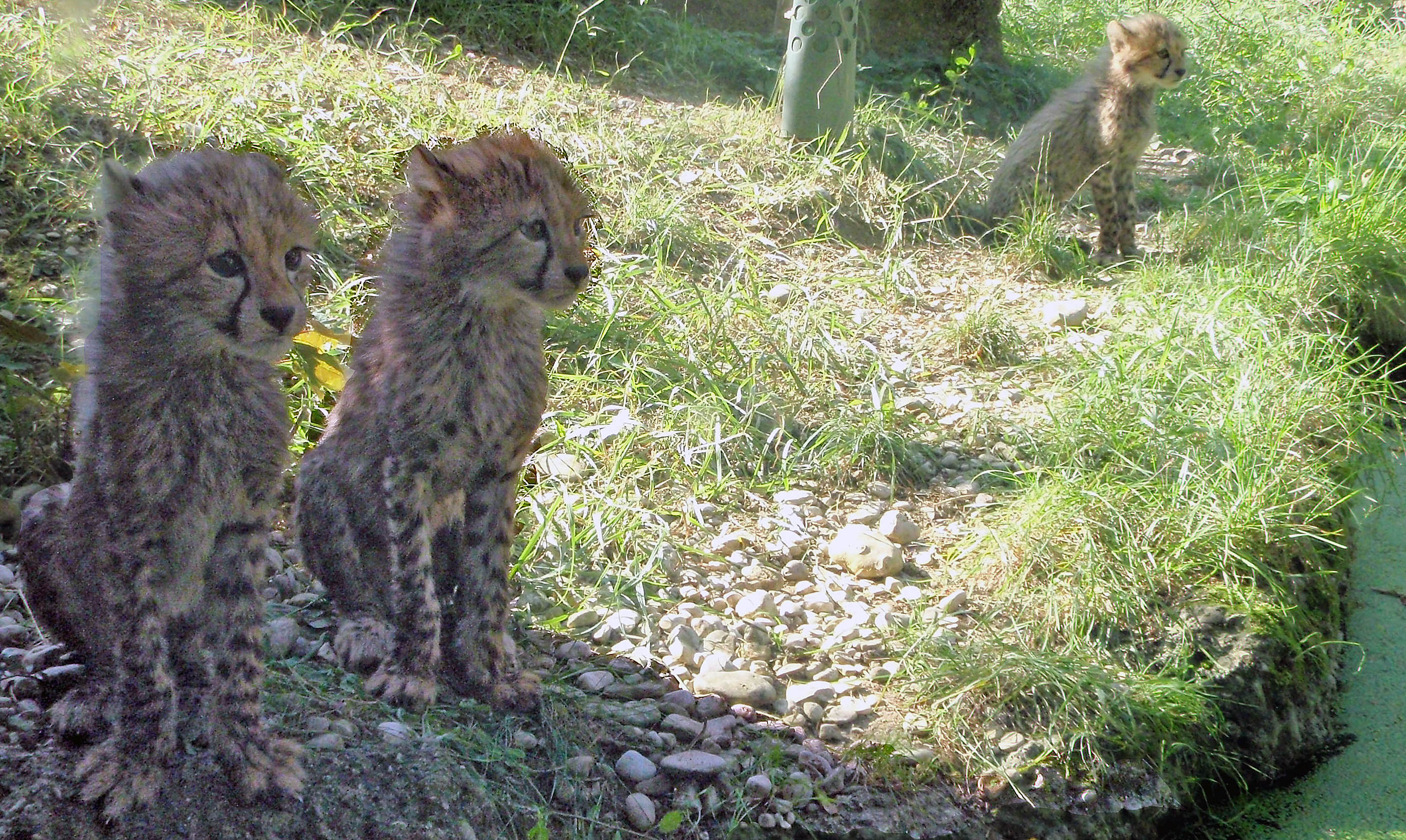
Cheetahs

Among 82 other European zoos with cheetahs, the zoo's breeding program is one in a dozen that has repeated success. Basel had five young cheetahs born in 1993, 1995, and 2007.

Cheetah breeding is difficult in captivity, as males and females live separately in the wild and females are picky in partners. The 30% mortality rate among newborns also lowers breeding success. That is why the new pair of female cheetahs that came to Basel in 2001 did not show interest in the presented males and had no offspring – until "Survivor" came from Vienna in 2006.

=== Currently in Basel ===
As of June 2011, the male "Survivor" and two females are living in Basel with two young cheetahs. On June 17, 2009, mother Msichana had two males and a female baby. The youngest cheetah died in the fall of 2009.

== Flamingos ==
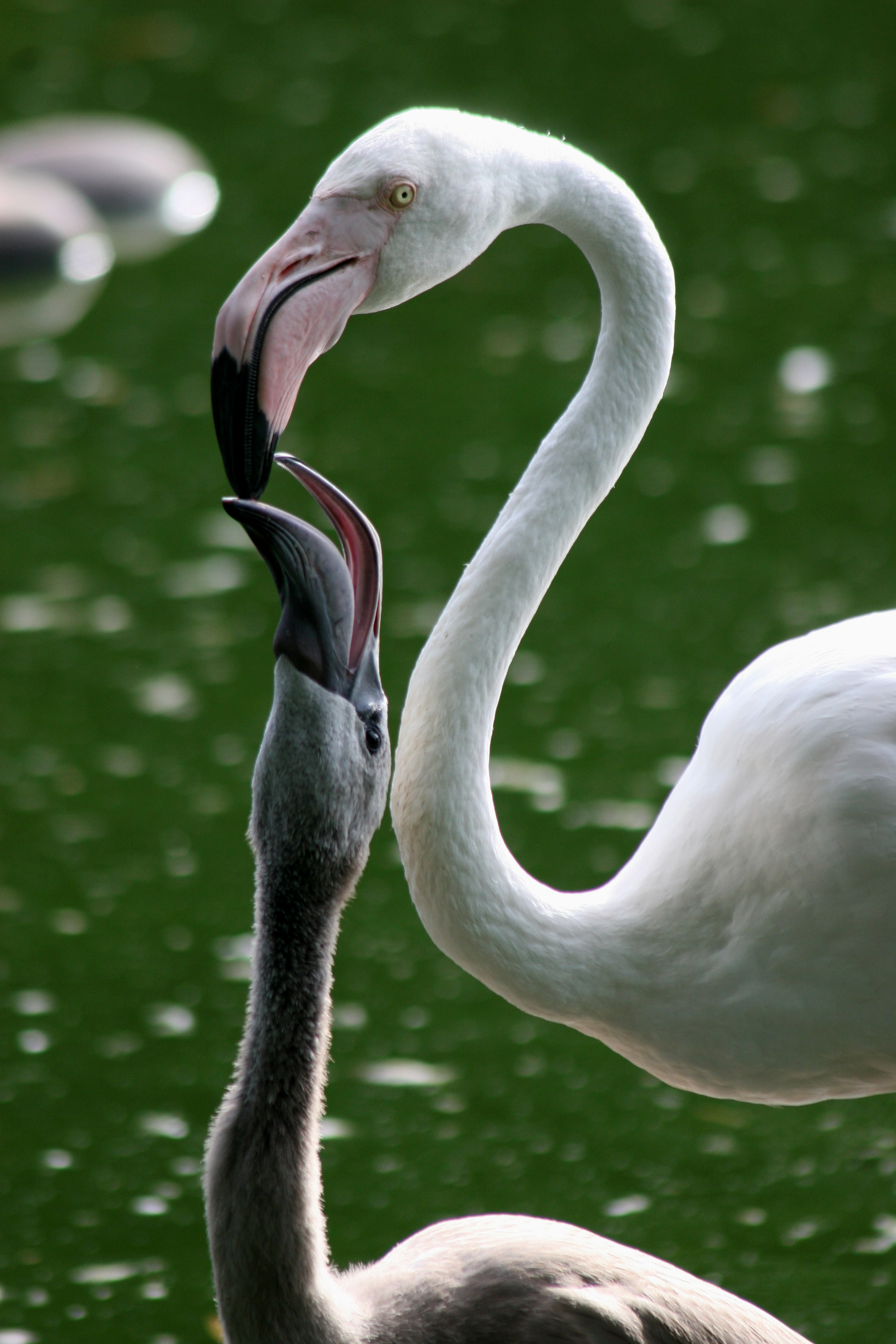
Chick feeding on crop milk.

For over 50 years Zoo Basel had its flamingo breeding program and hatched over 400 flamingos. Since 2000, every year 20 to 27 young flamingos are hatched in Basel. One of the main reasons for this annual success is the current flamingo exhibit which was built in 1991.

=== Currently in Basel ===
As of June 27, 2010, Basel's flamingo herd counts 113 individuals. During the spring of 2010, these birds built 41 nests and between June 5 and June 29, 2010 thirty-three flamingos hatched - of which thirty survived. This is a new record for the zoo, that never had these many flamingo hatches in its history. In a media release on June 22, 2010 zoo officials consider a calm hatching time and ideal weather as reasons for this record.

=== Basel history ===
Zoo Basel hatched the first flamingo, a Chilean flamingo in a European zoo in 1958 and a year later the first greater flamingo in captivity. While at first Zoo Basel had all six flamingo species, it decided to focus on the greater flamingo in the 1980s.

== Indian rhinoceros ==
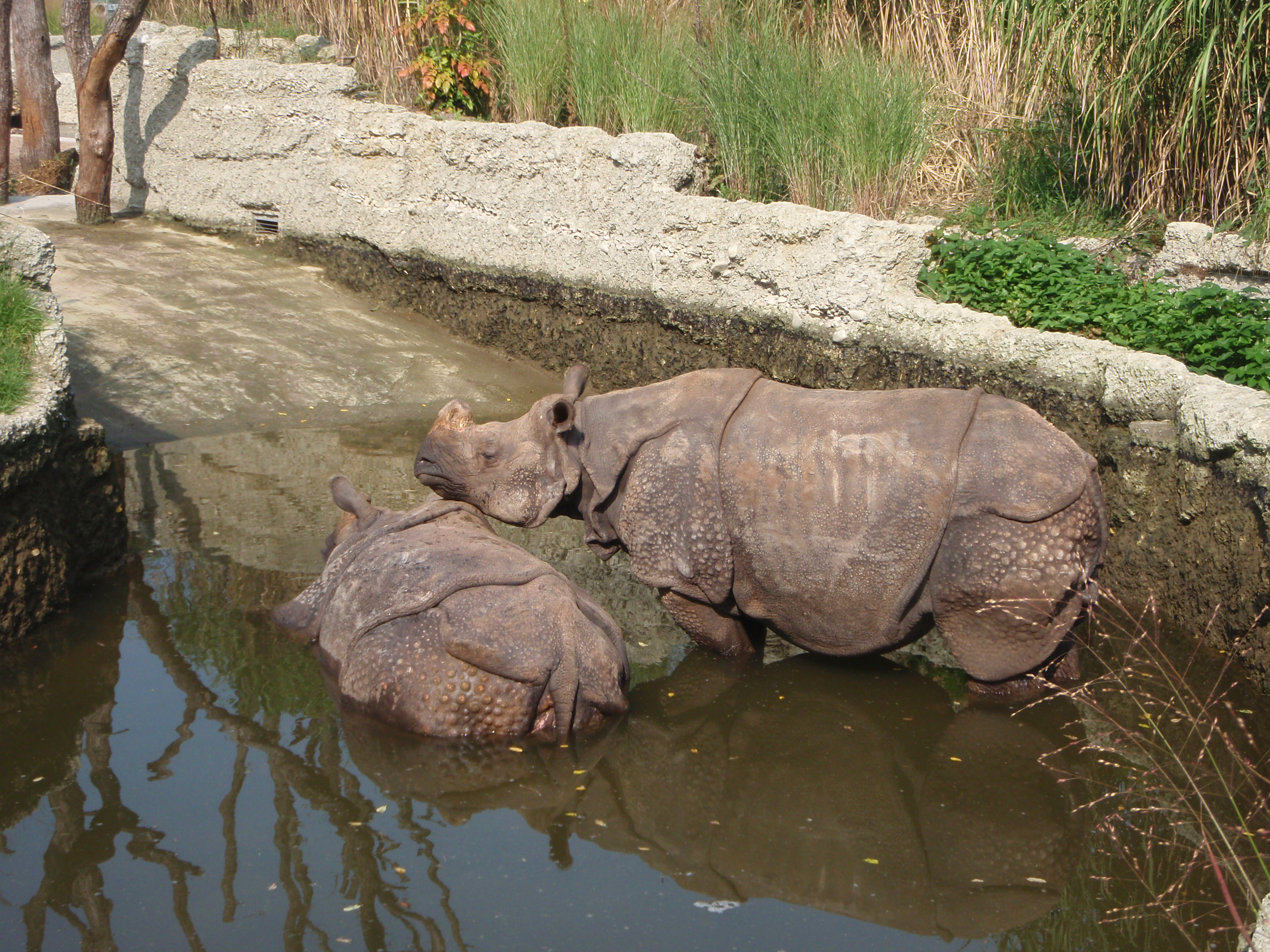
Rhinos in the outdoor exhibit

The Zoo Basel holds international studbook for the Indian rhinoceros since 1972 and coordinates since 1990 the European Endangered Species Programme (EEP), which ensures that the captive Indian rhinoceros population stays as genetically healthy as possible. One of the main reasons for Basel to have these studbooks is due to its successful breeding program.

=== Currently in Basel ===
As of September 2012, Ellora (1982), Quetta (1993), Jaffna (Basels stock bull / 1994), Henna (2010), and Jari (2012) live in the Zolli. On July 23, 2010, Ellora gave birth to a rhino girl called Henna, which is Ellora's seventh baby. Henna is unique in Basel's breeding history, as her left front leg is white. A video of Henna's birth can be watched here: rhino birth

=== Basel history ===
In 1952, the first rhino, the bull Gadadhar, arrived in Basel and a year later, the female Joymothi followed. These two animals are the parents of Basel's Indian rhino breeding program.

On September 14, 1956, the birth of rhino boy Rudra (the first Indian rhino born in a zoo) started Basel's Indian rhino success story. He was the son of Gadadhar and Joymothi that came from Kaziranga National Park. Two hours after birth he weighed 60.5 kg (133 lb) and was 105 cm (41 in) long and quickly gained 1.5 kilograms per day. In 1959, Rudra was transferred to the Milwaukee County Zoo, where he only became a father once until his death.

As of September 2012, 33 Indian rhinos have been born in Basel out of about 80 births worldwide. Therefore, most of the 174 Indian rhinoceroses in zoos around the globe are somehow related to the rhino population in Basel.

=== Rhino exhibit ===
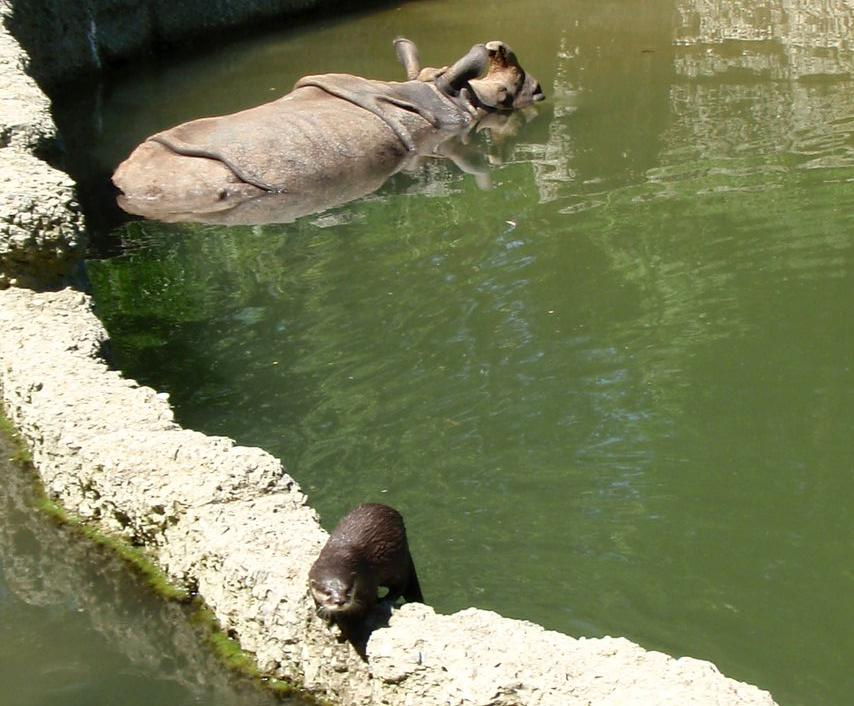
Rhino with otter

The Indian rhinoceros house and outdoor exhibit were built in 1959, extensively renovated from 2006 to 2008, and re-opened in May 2008. In the new rhinoceros exhibit, the rhinos, are sharing the outdoor exhibit with muntjacs, and Oriental small-clawed otters. As of July 2010, the three different species lived together with no incidents. The 2.5-ton-rhinoceroses are sharing their food with the 30-kilogram-muntjacs or go into one of four ponds where the Asian otters are swimming around the rhinos.

=== Preservation efforts ===
The Zolli supports Indian Rhino Vision 2020, which intends to increase the wild Indian rhino population to 3'000 animals. The partnership with the Orang National Park in India, where currently about 60 rhinos live, is one of the projects supported. In 2008, out of every day pass sold 15 Rappen (US$0.14) and out of every annual pass CHF 1.50 ($1.45) went to the Rhino Vision, totaling CHF 100'000 ($99,900).

== Okapi ==
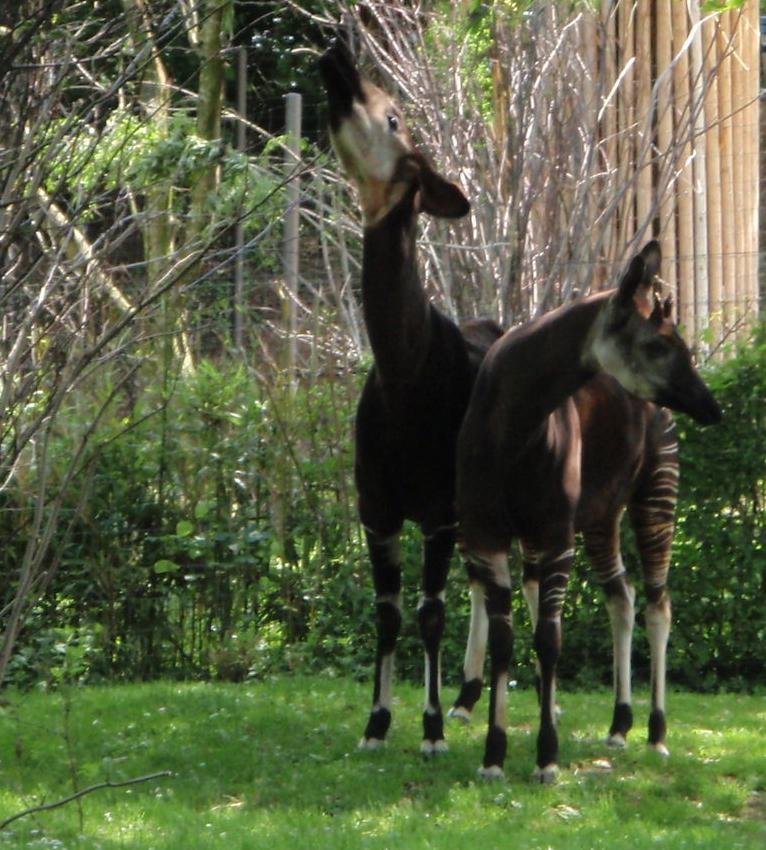
Stomp and Xina

Worldwide, there are about 160 okapis living in zoos. In Europe, there are about 55. Since Basel Zoo's first zoo birth in 1957, twenty-two okapis have been born in Basel (2009).

=== Currently in Basel ===
On December 2, 2009, the okapi bull Stomp (b. 2003) came from Zoo Berlin and on August 24, 2011 the female Hazima (b. 2007) arrived from the British Marwell Wildlife.

=== Basel history ===
The first okapi that arrived in Basel on June 16, 1949, was the bull Bambe. However, after only 66 days, he died due to liver parasites. Nanouk (1955) and Bibi (1956) followed him and laid the foundation of Basel's successful okapi breeding program.

In 2008, Basels Ahadi fathered the first okapi birth in the Czech Republic and Slovakia at Zoo Dvur Kralove. A video of this birth can be seen here on YouTube.

=== Okapi preservation efforts ===
All okapi zoos (including Basel) in Europe and North America are supporting the Okapi Wildlife Reserve managed by the Gilman International Conservation Organization, in the Ituri Rainforest (Democratic Republic of the Congo). In 2008, Zoo Basel donated $5,000 to the Gilman Conservation.

== Pygmy hippopotamus ==
Zoo Basel oversees the international studbook for the pygmy hippopotamus. Since the construction of the rhino exhibit, the pygmy hippos can only be viewed in their outdoor exhibits. During the winter they are inside.

=== Basel history ===
In 1928, the first animals arrived in Basel and started a breeding program in which 53 hippos were born and successfully raised. These animals and their offspring are living today in zoos all over the globe.

== Somali wild ass ==
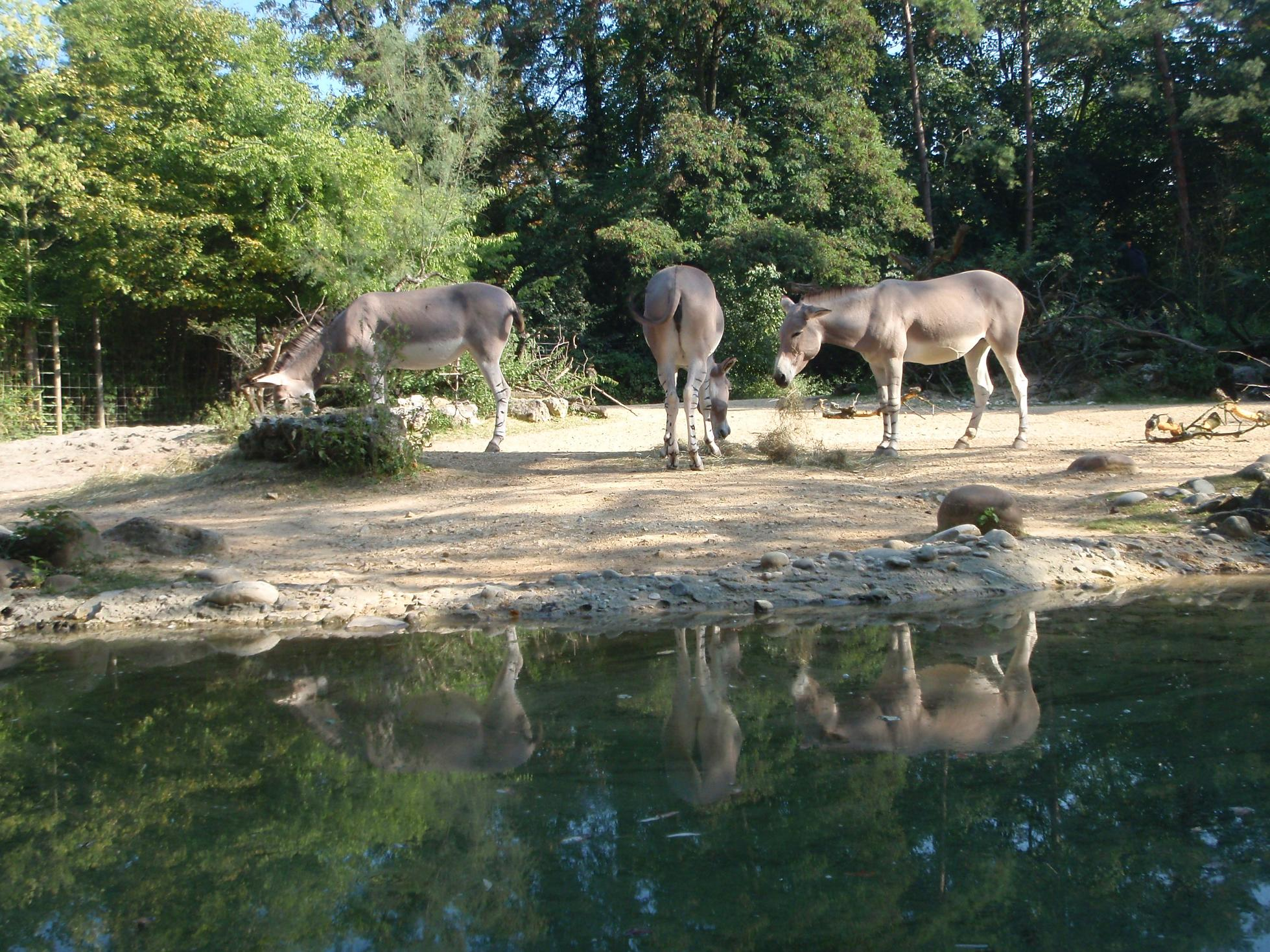
Somali wild ass

The Somali wild ass (Equus africanus somaliensis) is a wild donkey, a subspecies of the African wild ass. It is extremely endangered, as there are likely less than 1000 animals (or even 700) in the wild. There are about 200 individuals in zoos around the globe, of which 35 were born in Basel.

Zoo Basel manages the European studbook for the Somali wild ass and coordinates the European Endangered Species Programme (EEP). All European wild donkeys are either descendants of the original group at Zoo Basel or of 12 others that came from the Yotvata Hai-Bar Nature Reserve in Israel in 1972.

=== Currently in Basel ===
As of December 16, 2010, there are four Somali wild donkeys in Basel: The stallion "Ares" (22), three females (among them "Yogala"-12), and the baby girl "Hakaba."

=== Basel history ===
Basel started having Somali wild asses in 1970 and had its first birth in 1972. Since then, 11 stallions and 24 females were born and survived childhood.

=== Preservation efforts ===
Zoo Basel supports a conservation project in the Northeast African country of Eritrea, where 47 Somali wild ass live in the mountains between the Buri Peninsula and the Dalool ditch.
