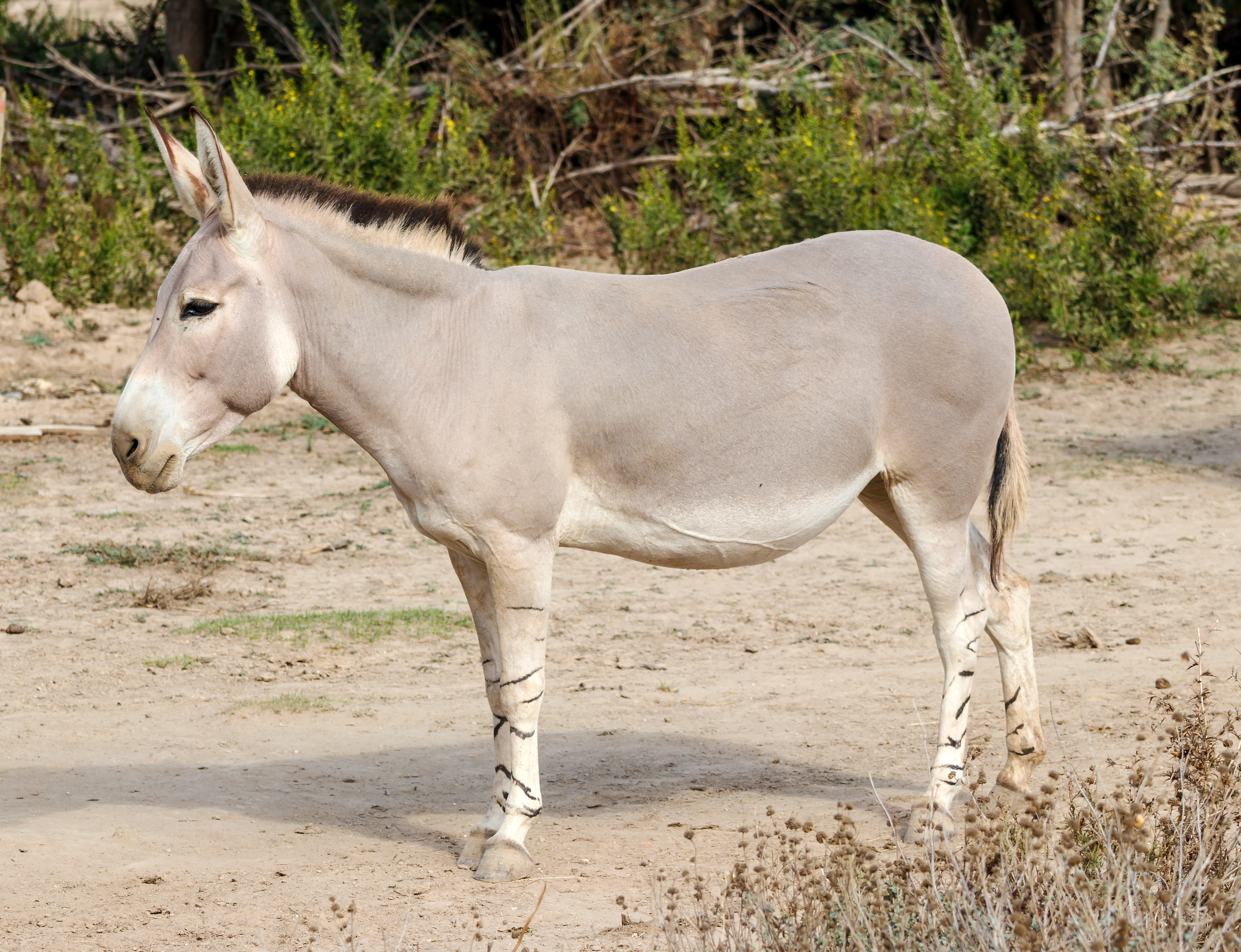
- Somali wild ass subspecies (Equus africanus somaliensis)

Conservation status
- Critically Endangered (IUCN 3.1)
- CITES Appendix I (Note: Excludes the domesticated form, which is referenced as Equus asinus and is not subject to the provisions of CITES.)

Scientific classification
- Kingdom: Animalia
- Phylum: Chordata
- Class: Mammalia
- Order: Perissodactyla
- Family: Equidae
- Genus: Equus
- Subgenus: Asinus
- Species: E. africanus

Binomial name
- Equus africanus (von Heuglin & Fitzinger, 1866)

Subspecies
- E. a. africanus E. a. somaliensis †E. a. atlanticus
- Geographic range

= African wild ass =

Species of wild ass

The African wild ass (Equus africanus) or African wild donkey, is a wild member of the horse family, Equidae. This species is thought to be the ancestor of the domestic donkey (Equus asinus), which is sometimes placed within the same species. They live in the deserts and other arid areas of the Horn of Africa, in Eritrea, Ethiopia and Somalia. It formerly had a wider range north and west into Sudan, Egypt, and Libya. It is critically endangered, with about 570 existing in the wild, making it the most threatened species of the family.

== Description ==
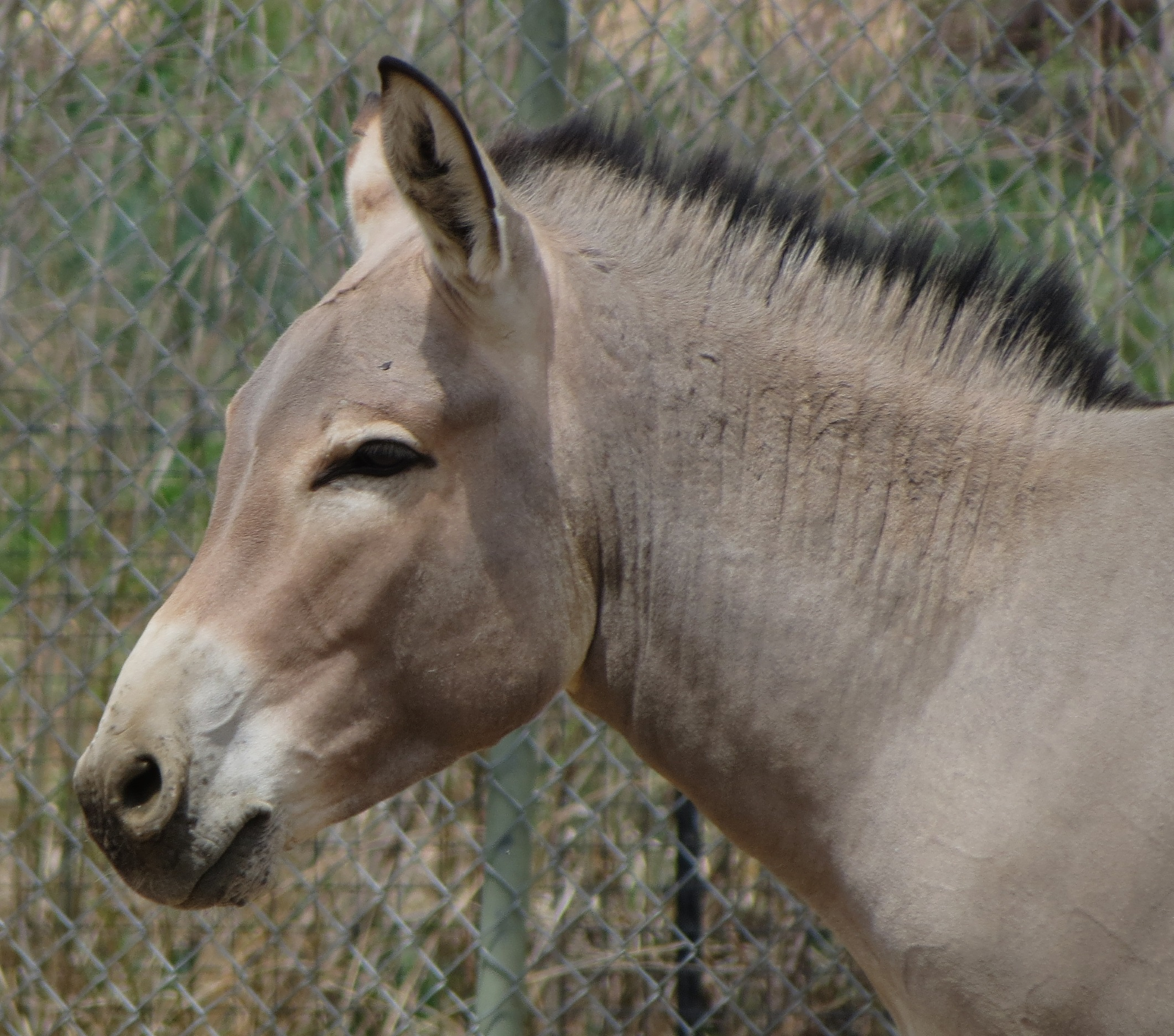
Close-up of head, Denver Zoo, Colorado

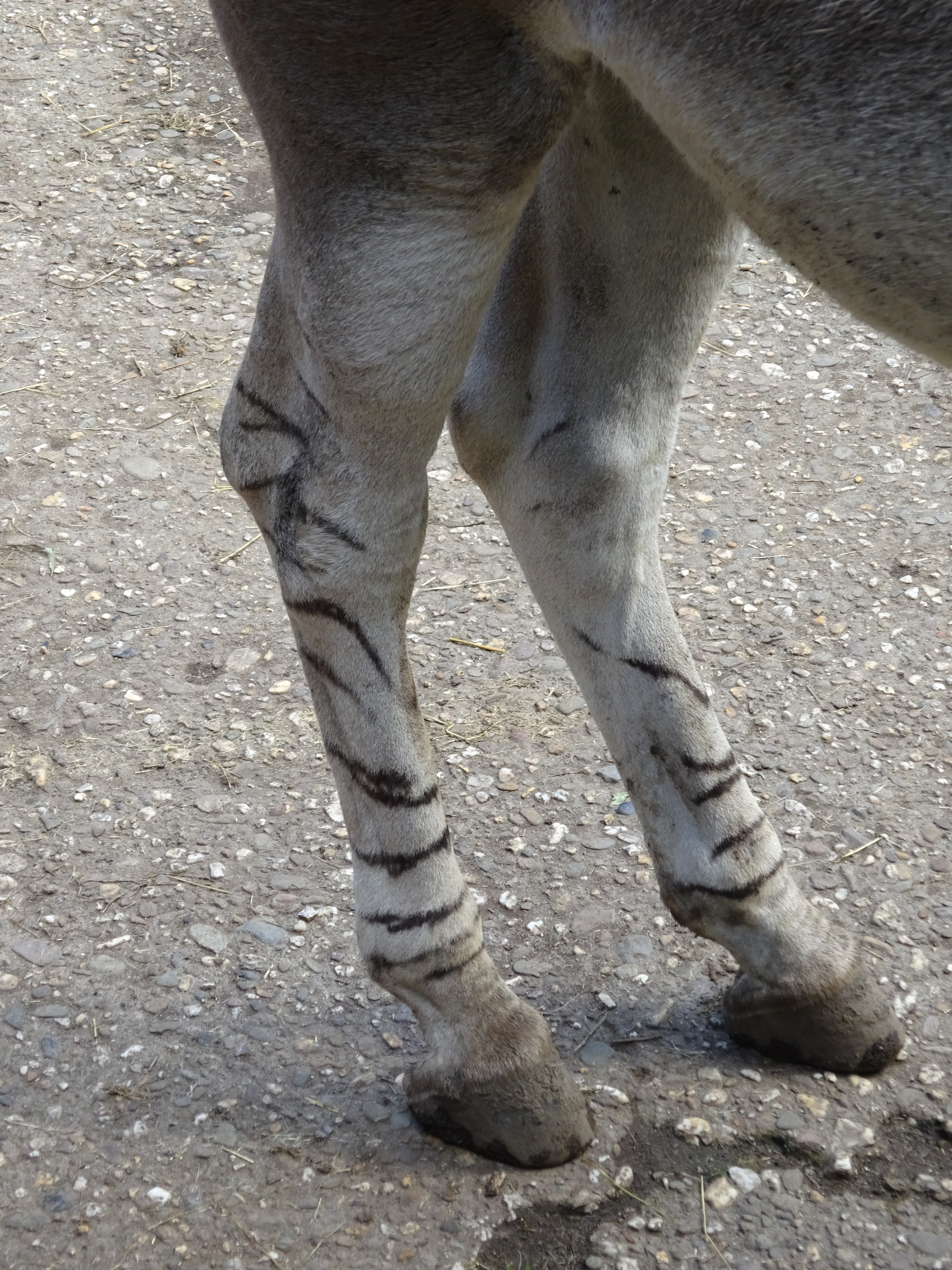
Close-up of hindlegs

The African wild ass is about 1.2 metres (4 ft) tall and weighs approximately 250 kilograms (600 lb). The short, smooth coat is a light grey to fawn colour, fading quickly to white on the undersides and legs. There is a slender, dark dorsal stripe in all subspecies, while in the Nubian wild ass (E. a. africanus), as well as the domestic donkey, there is a stripe across the shoulder. The legs of the Somali wild ass (E. a. somaliensis) are horizontally striped with black, resembling those of a zebra. On the nape of the neck, there is a stiff, upright mane, the hairs of which are tipped with black. The ears are large with black margins. The tail terminates with a black brush. The hooves are slender and approximately of the diameter as the legs.

== Evolution ==
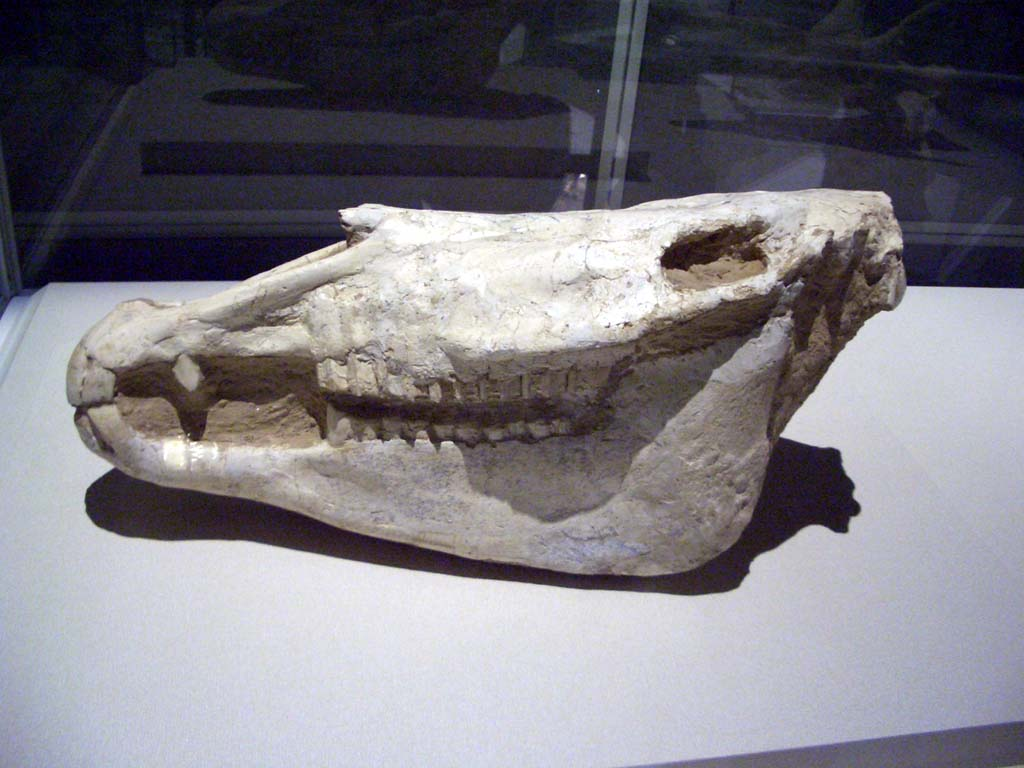
Skull of a giant extinct horse, Equus eisenmannae

The genus Equus, which includes all extant equines, is believed to have evolved from Dinohippus, via the intermediate form Plesippus. One of the oldest species is Equus simplicidens, described as zebra-like with a donkey-shaped head. The oldest fossil to date is ~3.5 million years old from Idaho in the United States. The genus appears to have spread quickly into the Old World, with the similarly aged Equus livenzovensis documented from western Europe and Russia.

Molecular phylogenies indicate the most recent common ancestor of all modern equids (members of the genus Equus) lived ~5.6 (3.9–7.8) mya. Direct paleogenomic sequencing of a 700,000-year-old middle Pleistocene horse metapodial bone from Canada implies a more recent 4.07 Myr before present date for the most recent common ancestor (MRCA) within the range of 4.0 to 4.5 Myr BP. The oldest divergencies are the Asian hemiones (subgenus E. (Asinus), including the kulan, onager, and kiang), followed by the African zebras (subgenera E. (Dolichohippus), and E. (Hippotigris)). All other modern forms including the domesticated horse (and many fossil Pliocene and Pleistocene forms) belong to the subgenus E. (Equus) which diverged ~4.8 (3.2–6.5) million years ago.

== Taxonomy ==
Different authors consider the African wild ass and the domesticated donkey one or two species; either view is technically legitimate, though the former is phylogenetically more accurate. However, the American Society of Mammalogists classifies the donkey as a distinct species, as it does with almost all domestic mammals.

The species name for the African wild ass is sometimes given as asinus, from the domestic donkey, whose specific name is older and usually would have priority. But this usage is erroneous since the International Commission on Zoological Nomenclature has conserved the name Equus africanus in Opinion 2027. This was done to prevent the confusing situation of the phylogenetic ancestor being taxonomically included in its descendant.

Thus, if one species is recognized, the correct scientific name of the donkey is E. africanus asinus.

The first published name for the African wild ass, Asinus africanus, Fitzinger, 1858, is a nomen nudum. The name Equus taeniopus von Heuglin, 1861 is rejected as indeterminable, as it is based on an animal that cannot be identified and may have been a hybrid between a domestic donkey and a Somali wild ass; the type has not been preserved. The first available name thus becomes Asinus africanus von Heuglin & Fitzinger, 1866. A lectotype is designated: a skull of an adult female collected by von Heuglin near Atbarah River, Sudan, and present in the State Museum of Natural History Stuttgart, MNS 32026. The subspecies recognized:

Image	Subspecies	Phenotype	Distribution
	Nubian wild ass Equus africanus africanus (von Heuglin & Fitzinger, 1866)	Gray coat, shoulder cross, no leg stripes	Nubian Desert of northeastern Sudan, from east of the Nile River to the Red Sea and south to the Atbarah River and northern Eritrea
	Somali wild ass Equus africanus somaliensis (Noack, 1884)	Lighter gray coat to light brown, no shoulder cross, leg stripes	Somalia, Somaliland, Eritrea and Ethiopia
	†Atlas wild ass Equus africanus atlanticus (P. Thomas, 1884)	Darker gray coat, shoulder cross (sometimes doubled), leg stripes	Region around the Atlas Mountains, across modern day Algeria, Tunisia and Morocco
	Domestic donkey Equus africanus asinus (Linnaeus, 1758)	Variable	Worldwide, domesticated

Cladogram based on whole nuclear genomes after Özkan et al. 2024.

- Asinus (asses)
  - Equus africanus + Equus asinus African wild ass + domestic donkeys
  - - †Equus hydruntinus (European wild ass/hydruntine)
    - - - †Equus hemionus hemippus (Syrian wild ass)
        - Equus hemionus onager (Persian onager)
      - - Equus hemionus hemionus (Mongolian wild ass) + Equus (hemionus) kiang (kiang)

African wild asses of unknown subspecies lived in the Sahara, Egypt, and Arabia, earlier in the Holocene.

== Habitat ==
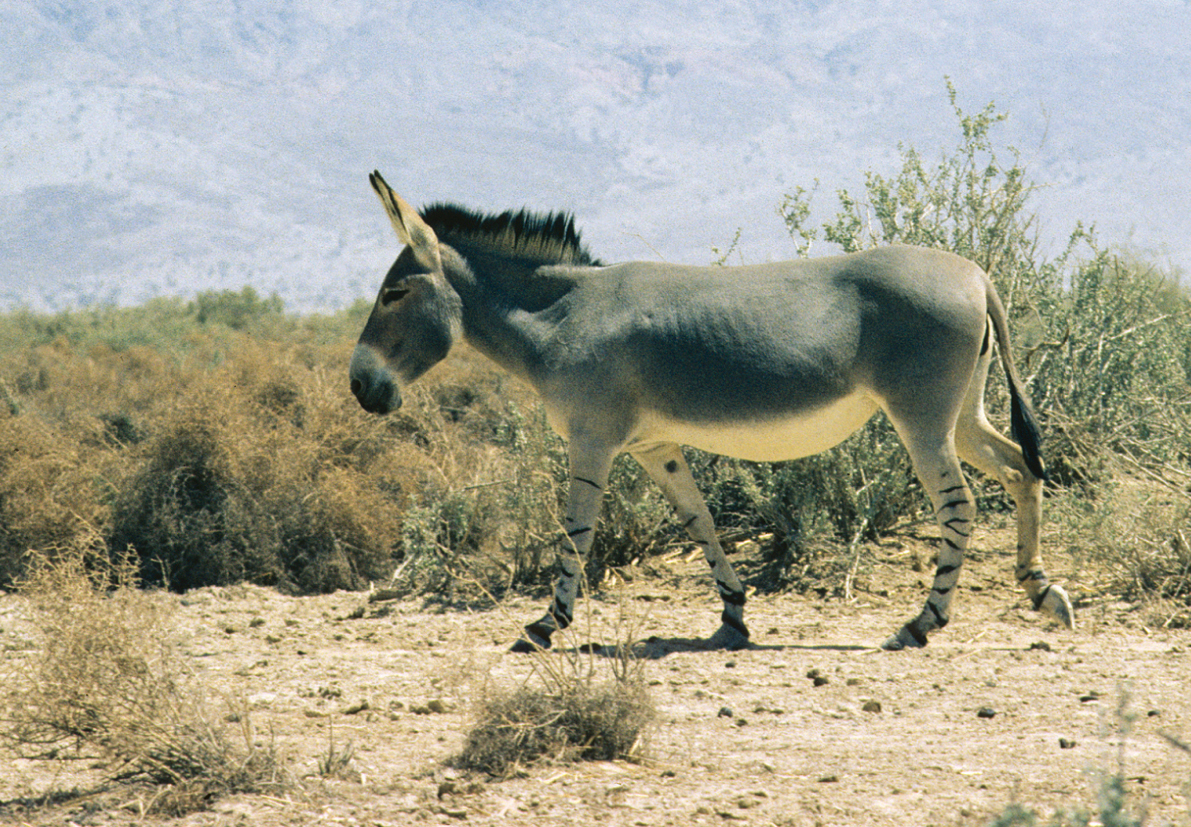
African wild ass in natural habitat.

African wild asses are found in desert or semidesert environments. They have tough digestive systems, which can break down desert vegetation and extract moisture from food efficiently. They are adapted to live with little water for long stretches of time. Their large ears give them a sharp sense of hearing and help in cooling. Because of the sparse vegetation in their environment, wild asses often live separated from each other (except for mothers and young), unlike the tightly grouped herds of wild horses. They have voices which can be heard for over 3 km (1.9 mi), which helps them to keep in contact with other asses.

== Behavior ==
The African wild ass is primarily active in the cooler hours between late afternoon and early morning, seeking shade and shelter amongst the rocky hills during the day. The Somali wild ass is also very agile and nimble-footed, capable of moving quickly across boulder fields and in the mountains. On the flat, it has been recorded reaching speeds of 70 km/h (43 mph). In keeping with these feats, its soles are particularly hard and its hooves grow very quickly.

Mature males defend large territories around 23 square kilometres in size, marking them with dung heaps – an essential marker in the flat, monotonous terrain. Due to the size of these ranges, the dominant male cannot exclude other males. Rather, intruders are tolerated – recognized and treated as subordinates, and kept as far away as possible from any of the resident females. In the presence of estrous females, the males bray loudly. These animals live in loose herds of up to fifty individuals.

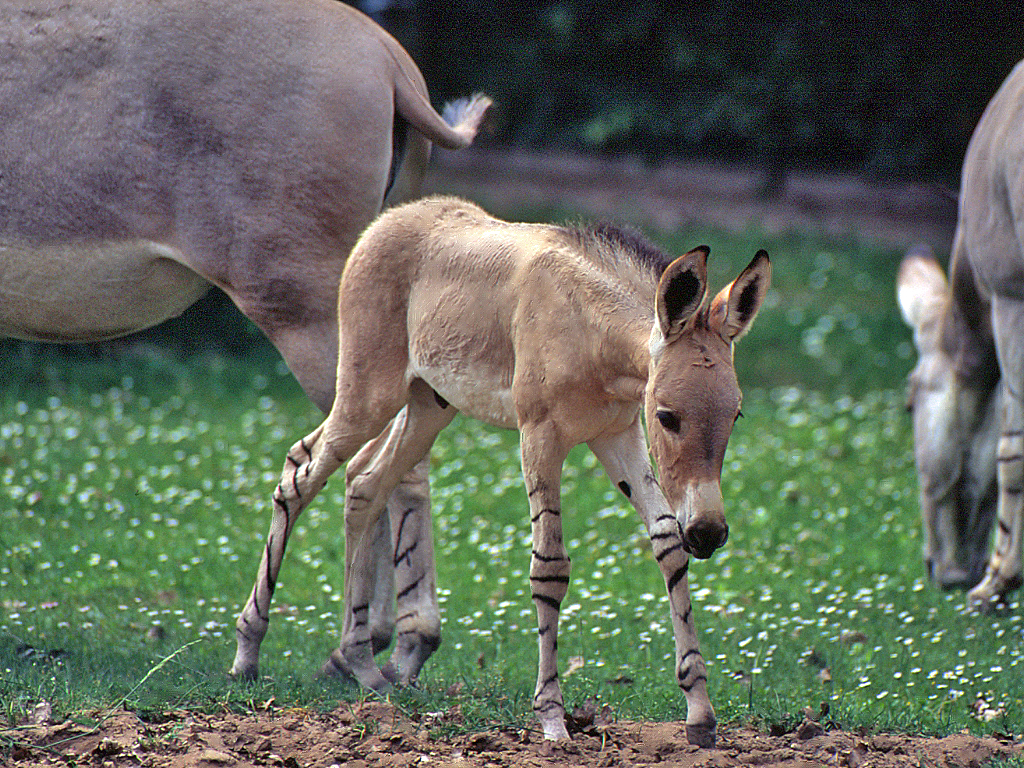
Foal of Somali wild ass (E. a. somalicus)

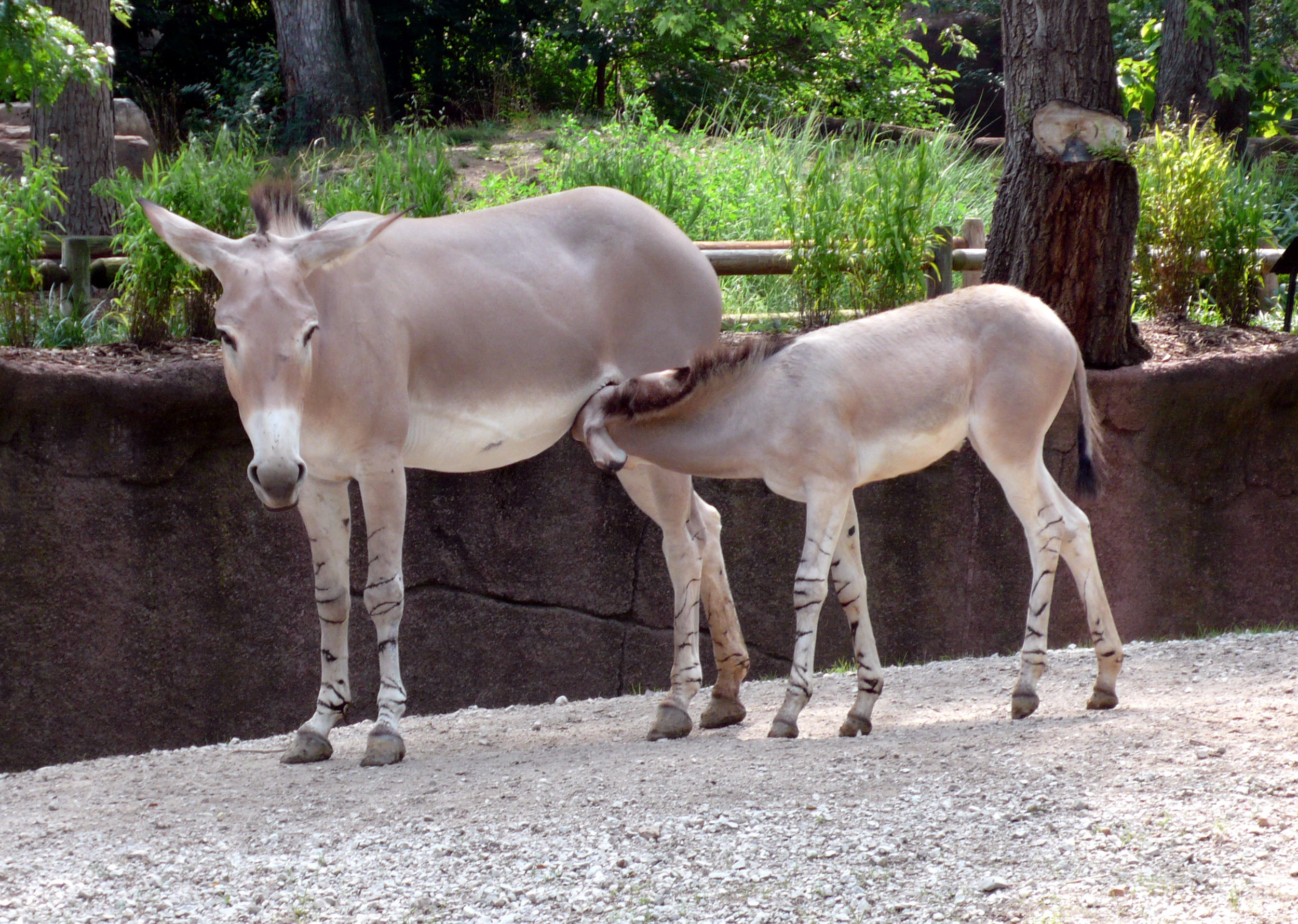
Somali wild ass mother and foal

In the wild, African wild ass breeding occurs during the wet season. The gestation period lasts for 11 to 12 months, and one foal is born during the period from October to February. The foal weans for 6 to 8 months after birth, reaching sexual maturity at the age of 2 years. Lifespan is up to 40 years in captivity.

Wild asses can run swiftly, almost as fast as a horse. However, unlike most hoofed mammals, their tendency is to not flee right away from a potentially dangerous situation, but to investigate first before deciding what to do. When they need to, they can defend themselves with kicks from both their front and hind legs. Equids were used in ancient Sumer to pull wagons circa 2600 BC, and then chariots on the Standard of Ur, circa 2000 BC. These have been suggested to represent onagers, but are now thought to have been domesticated asses.

== Diet ==
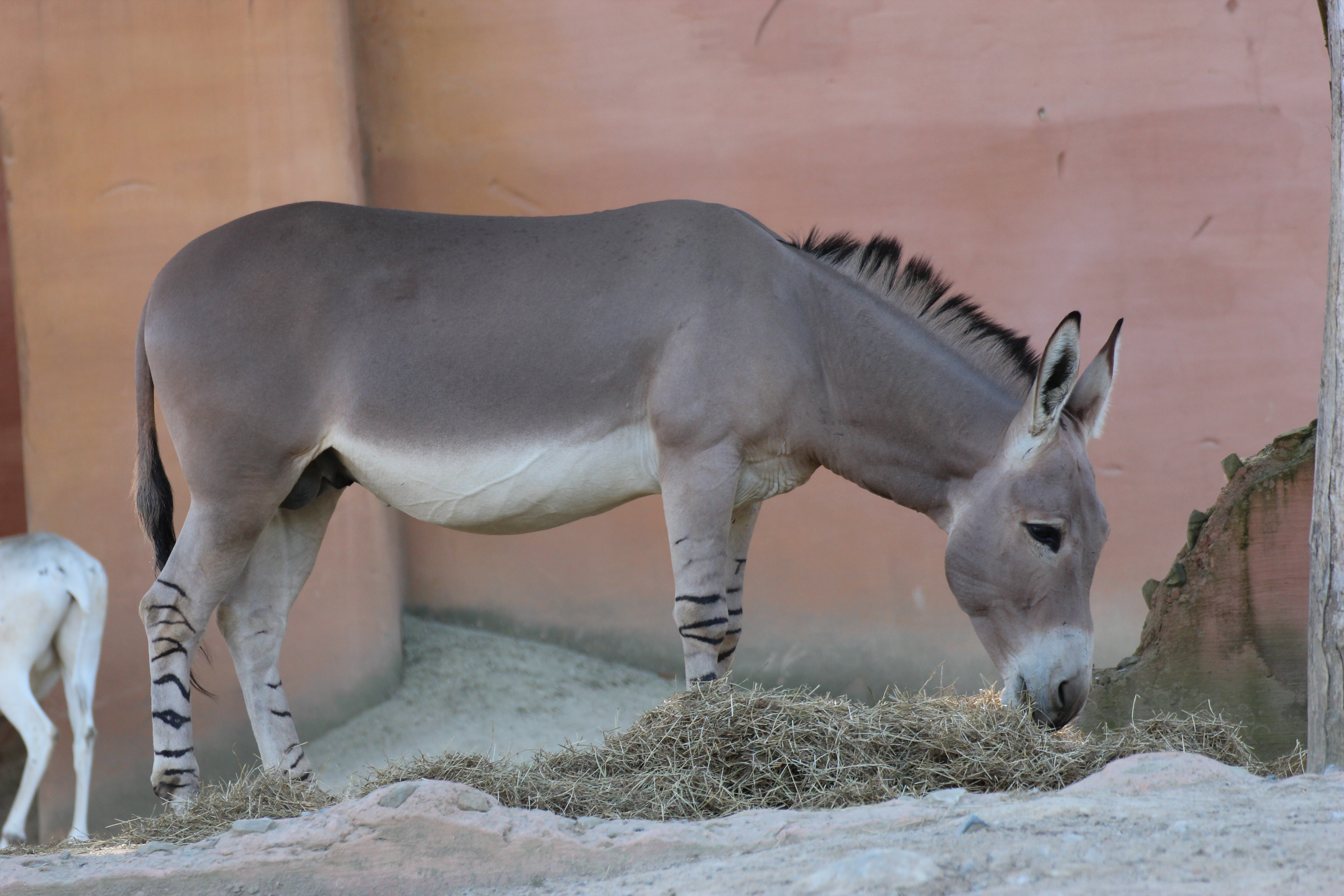
Somali wild ass eating hay, at the Hanover Zoo, Hanover, Germany

The African wild asses' diet consists of grasses, bark, and leaves. Despite being primarily adapted for living in an arid climate, they are dependent on water, and when not receiving the needed moisture from vegetation, they must drink at least once every three days. However, they can survive on a surprisingly small amount of liquid, and have been reported to drink salty or brackish water.

== Conservation status ==
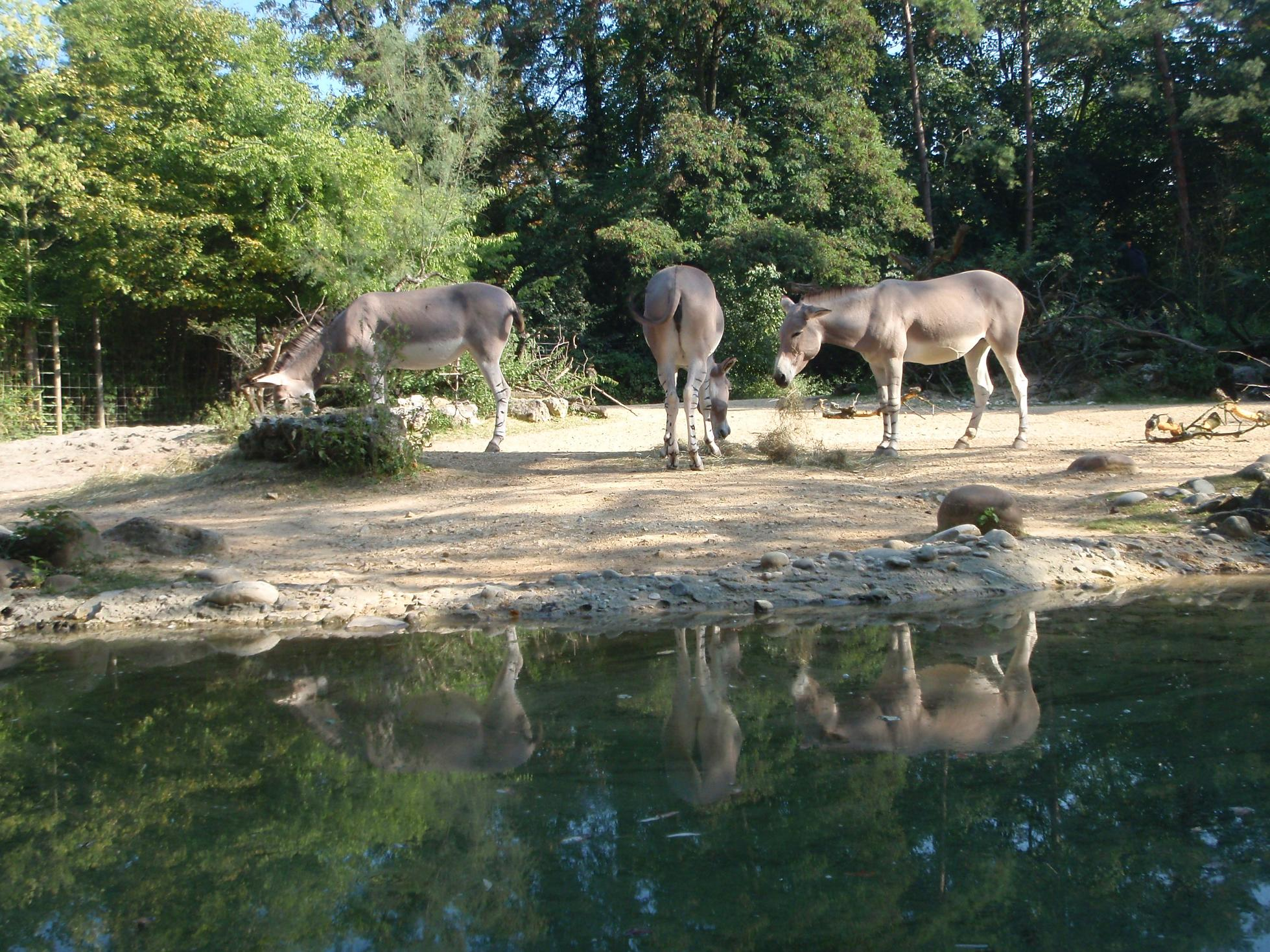
Somali wild ass at Zoo Basel

Though the species itself is under no threat of extinction, due to abundant domestic stock (donkeys and burros), the two extant wild subspecies are both listed as critically endangered. African wild asses have been captured for domestication for centuries and this, along with interbreeding between wild and domestic animals, has caused a distinct decline in population numbers. There are now only a few hundred individuals left in the wild. These animals are also hunted for food and for traditional medicine in both Ethiopia and Somalia. Competition with domestic livestock for grazing, and restricted access to water supplies caused by agricultural developments, pose further threats to the survival of this species. The African wild ass is legally protected in the countries where it is currently found, although these measures often prove difficult to enforce. A protected population of the Somali wild ass exists in the Yotvata Hai-Bar Nature Reserve in Israel, to the north of Eilat. This reserve was established in 1968 with the view to bolster populations of endangered desert species. Populations of horses and asses are fairly resilient and, if the species is properly protected, it may well recover from its current low.

== In captivity ==
There are about 150 individual Somali wild asses living in zoos around the globe, of which 36 were born at Zoo Basel, where this species' breeding program started with Basel's first Somali wild asses in 1970 and the first birth in 1972.

Zoo Basel manages the European studbook for the Somali wild ass and coordinates the European Endangered Species Programme (EEP). All European wild donkeys are either descendants of the original group at Zoo Basel or of 12 others that came from the Yotvata Hai-Bar Nature Reserve in Israel in 1972.

== See also ==
- Endangered species
- Fauna of Africa
- Feral donkeys in Australia
- Asiatic wild ass
