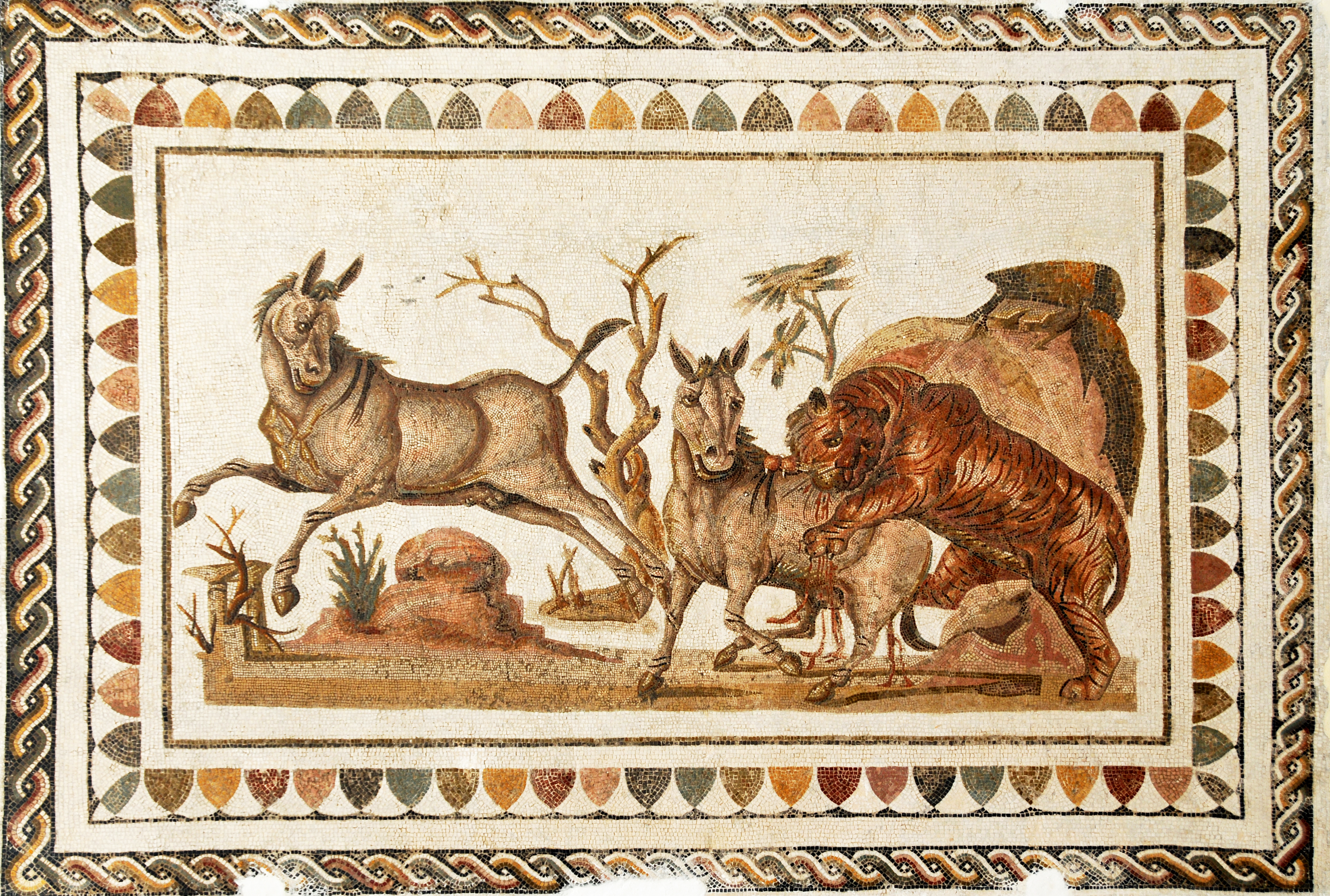
- Atlas wild asses in a Roman mosaic of El Jem, shown attacked by a tiger

Conservation status
- Extinct (ca. 300 AD)

Scientific classification
- Kingdom: Animalia
- Phylum: Chordata
- Class: Mammalia
- Order: Perissodactyla
- Family: Equidae
- Genus: Equus
- Species: E. africanus
- Subspecies: †E. a. atlanticus

Trinomial name
- †Equus africanus atlanticus P. Thomas, 1884

= Atlas wild ass =

Purported extinct subspecies of mammal

The Atlas wild ass (Equus africanus atlanticus), also known as Algerian wild ass, is a purported extinct subspecies of the African wild ass that was once found across North Africa and parts of the Sahara.

It was last represented in a villa mural ca. 300 AD in Bona, Algeria, and may have become extinct as a result of Roman sport hunting.

== Taxonomy ==
Purported bones have been found in a number of rock shelters across Morocco and Algeria by paleontologists including Alfred Romer (1928, 1935) and Camille Arambourg (1931). While the existence of numerous prehistoric rock art depictions, and Roman mosaics leave no doubt about the former existence of African wild asses in North Africa, it has been claimed that the original bones that were used to describe the subspecies atlanticus actually belonged to a fossil zebra. Therefore, the name E. a. atlanticus would be "unavailable" to the Atlas wild ass.

It was also hypothesized that the appearance of Nubian and Somali wild asses were clinal and that they appeared different as an artifact of the recent extinction of intermediate-looking populations. This would make the living African wild ass a monotypic species with no subspecies, and at least question the existence of extinct subspecies like the Atlas wild ass. However, genetic studies have shown since that Nubian and Somali wild asses are different enough to warrant subspecies status. Additionally, domestic donkeys carry two different haplotypes, one shared with the Nubian wild ass, and another of unknown origin that is not found in the Somali wild ass. The presence of the extinct Atlas wild ass in the Ancient Mediterranean makes it a plausible source for the second haplotype.

== Description ==
Ancient art consistently depicts the African wild asses of North Africa as similar to, but darker colored than, the Nubian and Somali wild ass subspecies. The general color was gray, with marked black and white stripes on the legs, and a black shoulder cross (sometimes doubled). In comparison, the Nubian wild ass is gray with shoulder cross but no stripes, and the Somali wild ass is sandy with black stripes, but no shoulder cross. One or both features appear occasionally in domestic donkeys. Wild and primitive domestic asses are indistinguishable from their bones, which complicates their identification in archaeological sites.

== Range and ecology ==
The Atlas wild ass was found in the region around the Atlas Mountains, across modern day Algeria, Tunisia and Morocco. It might also have occurred in rocky areas of the Saharan Desert, but not in sands which are avoided by wild asses. However, the 20th century reports of wild asses from northern Chad and the Hoggar Massif in the central Sahara are doubtful.
