= Ficus rigidifolia =

Ficus rigidifolia is a taxon synonym for two species of plants:

- Ficus rigidifolia Bureau, a synonym of Ficus nitidifolia Bureau
- Ficus rigidifolia Pittier, a synonym of Ficus guianensis Desv.
