= Opinion 2027 =

Ruling on the conservation of 17 species names of wild animals with domestic derivatives

Opinion 2027 is a 2003 ruling of the International Commission on Zoological Nomenclature (ICZN) concerning the conservation of 17 species names of wild animals with domestic derivatives. Opinion 2027 is in response to Case 3010 and subsequent comments.

The 17 names involved:

- Bombyx mandarina
- Bos gaurus
- Bos mutus
- Bos primigenius
- Bubalus arnee
- Camelus ferus
- Canis lupus
- Capra aegagrus
- Carassius gibelio
- Cavia aperea
- Equus africanus
- Equus ferus
- Felis silvestris
- Lama guanicoe
- Mustela putorius
- Ovis orientalis
- Vicugna vicugna

The opinion of the commission was that "the "name of a wild species...is not invalid by virtue of being predated by the name based on a domestic form." These 17 species of wild animals were named later than the relevant domestic animals, hence the use of the ICZN provision for conservation. The names of the 17 species were added to the Official Lists and Indexes of Names in Zoology of the ICZN, which means that they are valid taxa.
