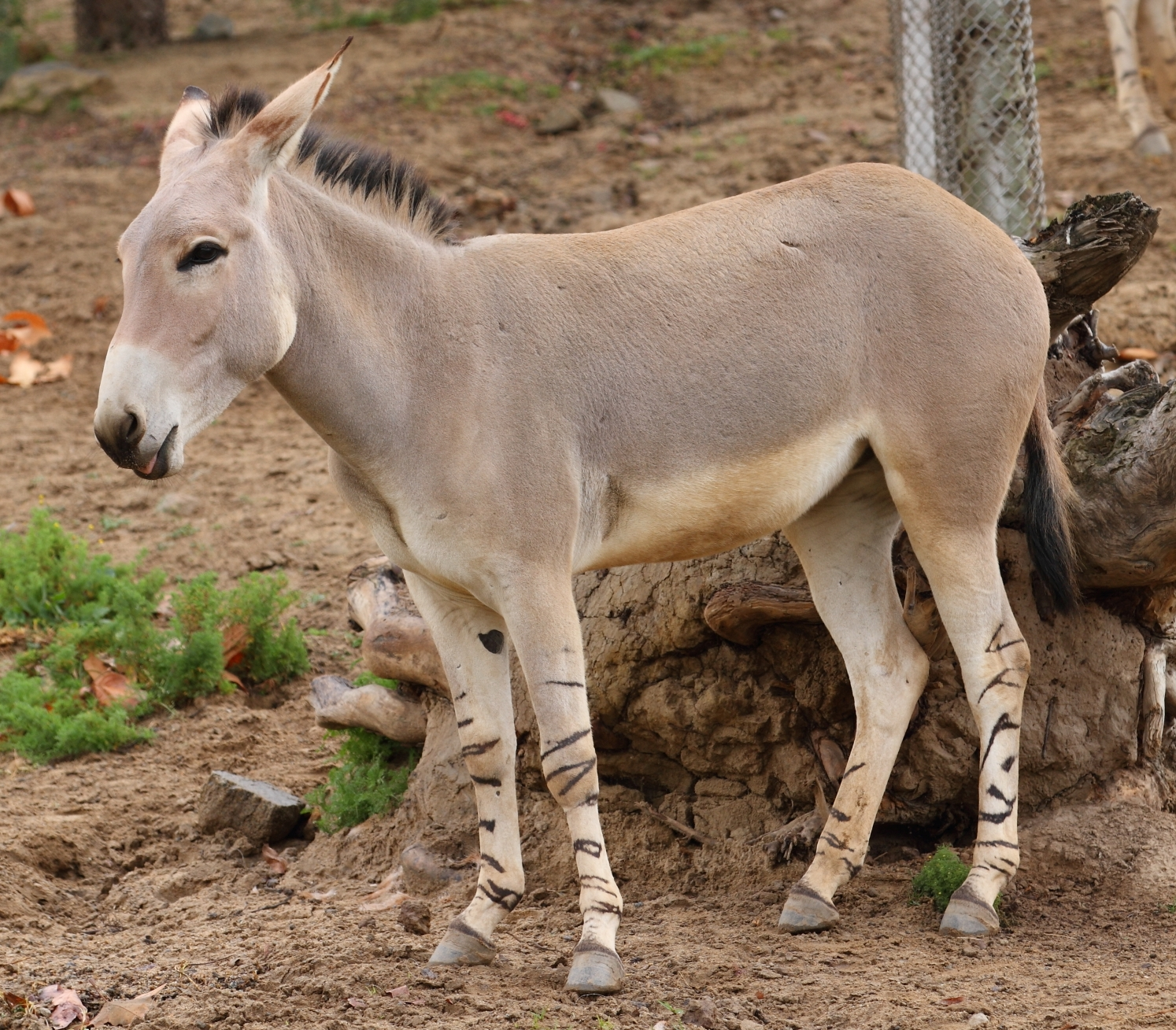

Conservation status
- Critically Endangered (IUCN 3.1)

Scientific classification
- Kingdom: Animalia
- Phylum: Chordata
- Class: Mammalia
- Order: Perissodactyla
- Family: Equidae
- Genus: Equus
- Species: E. africanus
- Subspecies: E. a. somaliensis

Trinomial name
- Equus africanus somaliensis (Noack, 1884)

Synonyms
- Asinus taeniopus var. Somaliensis Noack, 1884; Equus asinus somalicus Sclater, 1884

= Somali wild ass =

Subspecies of African wild ass

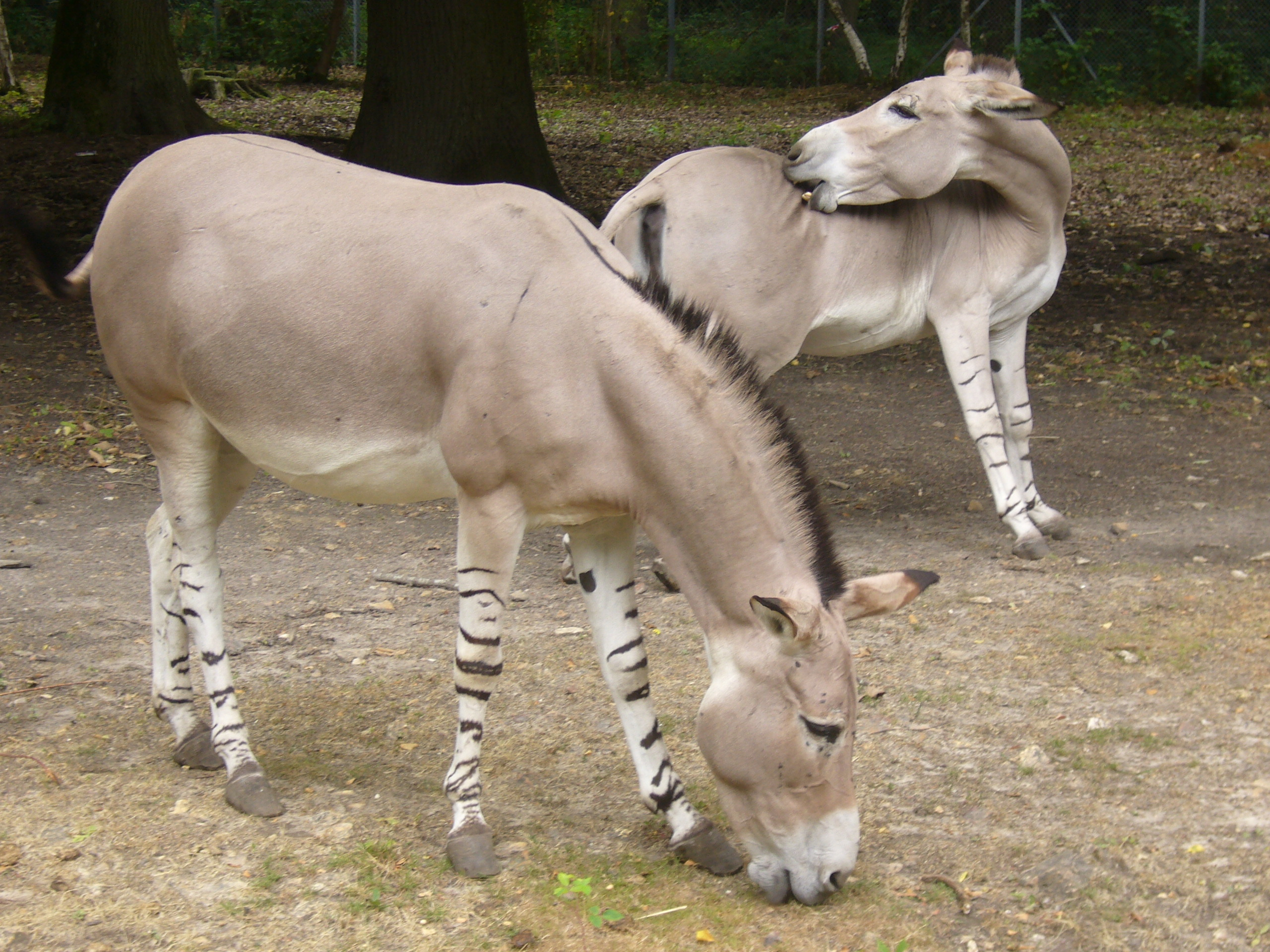
Two Somali Wild Asses ZooSafari de Thoiry

The Somali wild ass (Equus africanus somaliensis) is a subspecies of the African wild ass.

The legs of the Somali wild ass are striped, resembling those of its relatives, the zebras. There are estimated to be 600 specimens living in the wild. They live in Somalia, Somaliland, the Southern Red Sea region of Eritrea, and the Afar Region of Ethiopia. In addition, an estimated 200 specimens live in captivity in zoos worldwide.

The IUCN Red List of endangered species described it as "critically endangered", and they face an extremely high risk of extinction in the wild.

== Behavior ==
Due to the limited resources found in their habitat, Somali wild asses live in a fission–fusion society. Most adults live alone, but sometimes form small herds consisting of females and their young. In areas that have more resources, or have more rain, they will sometimes fuse together to form larger temporary herds. Stallions can maintain territories as large as nine square miles. They frequently leave dung piles as markers to remind them of their territory's boundaries. While females are welcome in their territories, stallions will often fight other males who try to mate with females in their territories. However, stallions have been observed allowing males into their territories for grazing, as long as they show no interest in his harem.

=== Reproduction ===
Somali wild asses typically give birth in the spring, a common characteristic among equids, after a year-long gestation. Within hours, the foal is up on its legs and keeping up with its mother. At around five days old, the foal is already nibbling grass. By the time its two weeks old, the foal is grazing regularly, however, still depending on its mother's milk for fluids. The foal is weaned by 12 to 14 months, but still stays close to its mother, only leaving to play or feed with the other foals in the herd.

== Breeding programs ==
=== Zoo Basel ===
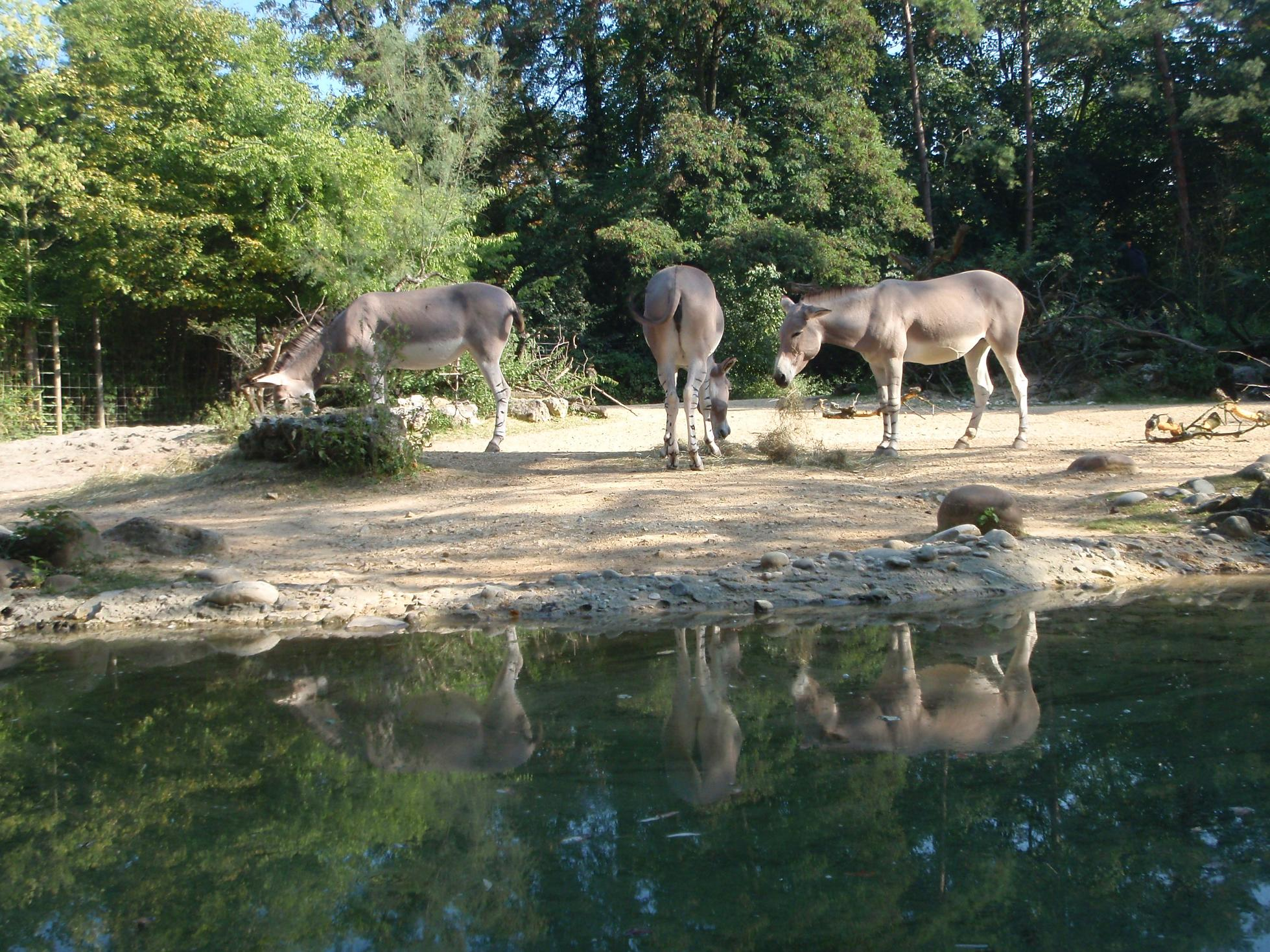
Somali Wild Ass at Zoo Basel

The leading zoo for breeding the Somali wild ass is Zoo Basel, Switzerland. Its breeding program manages the European studbook for the Somali wild ass and coordinates the European Endangered Species Programme (EEP) as well as the global species committee of the Somali Wild Ass since 2004.

Zoo Basel started keeping Somali wild asses in 1970 and had its first birth in 1972. As of 2009, 11 stallions and 24 mares were born and survived to adulthood. Today, all Somali wild asses in captivity are related to the original group at Zoo Basel. As of January 18, 2012, there were four Somali wild asses in Basel: The stallion "Gigolo" and three females, among them "Yogala".

=== France ===
Since 1987, the Réserve Africaine de Sigean, in the south of France, has had several Somali wild asses, with births occurring on June 30, 2010, and on March 29, 2013.

=== United States ===
Only six institutions breed Somali wild ass in the United States: Dallas Zoo, Saint Louis Zoo, San Diego Zoo Safari Park, Zoo Miami, Denver Zoo and White Oak Conservation in Yulee, Florida. White Oak Conservation received a herd in 2008 as part of an international effort to save Somali wild ass from extinction. Since then, the herd has produced 18 foals, including several born in spring 2013.

The Dallas Zoo had two Somali wild ass foals, both female, one born July 9 and the other on July 19, 2017. The most recent birth at the Saint Louis Zoo was on July 30, 2019. In January 2025, a female was born at the Denver Zoo. The San Diego Zoo Safari Park is home to eleven Somali Wild Asses, the largest population of Somali Wild Asses in North America. The park received its first herd from the Basel Zoo in 1981. The first foal was born in 1986. Since then, 49 foals have been born, including a female born on March 17, 2018.

=== Czech Republic ===
In July 2023, a male was born at Safari Park Dvůr Králové.

=== United Kingdom ===
In June 2022, a Somali wild ass was born at Africa Alive; the mother had arrived in 2007 from Basel Zoo. In August 2024, a Somali wild ass was born at Knowsley Safari Park. In September 2024, a Somali wild ass was born at Woburn Safari Park.

== Protected populations in the wild ==
A conservation project (mainly supported by Zoo Basel) in Eritrea counted (before 2014) 47 Somali wild asses living in the mountains between the Buri Peninsula and the Dallol Depression, which is within the larger Danakil Depression, near Eritrea's border with Ethiopia.

A protected population of the Somali wild ass exists in the Yotvata Hai-Bar Nature Reserve. This Israeli reserve was established in 1968 with the view to bolster populations of endangered desert species.

== Domestication ==
There are domestic donkeys found in Italy that were descended from the Somali wild ass since the times of Ancient Rome, as opposed to donkeys from other European countries where domesticated stock are usually descended from the Nubian wild ass.
