= Ficus americana subsp. greiffiana =

Conservation status
- Least Concern (IUCN 2.3)

Scientific classification
- Kingdom: Plantae
- Clade: Tracheophytes
- Clade: Angiosperms
- Clade: Eudicots
- Clade: Rosids
- Order: Rosales
- Family: Moraceae
- Genus: Ficus
- Species: F. americana
- Subspecies: F. a. subsp. greiffiana

Trinomial name
- Ficus americana subsp. greiffiana (Dugand) C.C.Berg

Synonyms
- Ficus greiffiana Dugand

Species of flowering plant

Ficus americana subsp. greiffiana is a subspecies of flowering plant in the family Moraceae. It is a tree native to northern and west-central Brazil, Colombia, French Guiana, and Guyana.

It was first described as Ficus greiffiana by Armando Dugand in 1942. In 2007 Cornelis Christiaan Berg concluded it was a subspecies of Ficus americana, and renamed it Ficus americana subsp. greiffiana.
