= Conserved name =

Scientific name protected from disuse

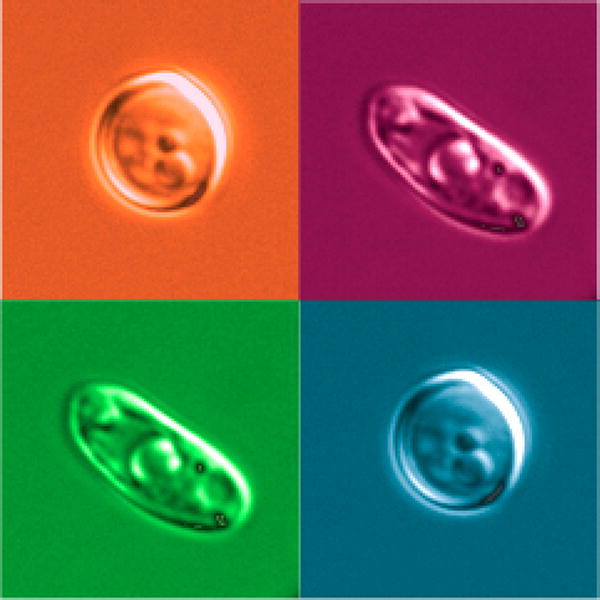
The name for this yeast, Candida albicans, is a nomen conservandum.

A conserved name or nomen conservandum (plural nomina conservanda, abbreviated as nom. cons.) is a scientific name that has specific nomenclatural protection in that the name is retained, even though it violates one or more rules that would otherwise prevent it from being legitimate. Nomen conservandum is a Latin term, meaning 'a name to be conserved'. While "conserved name" and "nomen conservandum" are often used interchangeably, such as by the International Code of Nomenclature for Algae, Fungi, and Plants (ICN), the International Code of Zoological Nomenclature favors "conserved name".

The process for conserving botanical names is different from that for zoological names. Under the botanical code, names may also be "suppressed", nomen rejiciendum (plural nomina rejicienda or nomina utique rejicienda, abbreviated as nom. rej.), or rejected in favor of a particular conserved name, and combinations based on a suppressed name are also listed as nom. rej.

== Botany ==
=== Conservation ===
In botanical nomenclature, conservation is a nomenclatural procedure governed by Article 14 of the ICN. Its purpose is "to avoid disadvantageous nomenclatural changes entailed by the strict application of the rules, and especially of the principle of priority [...]" (Art. 14.1). It applies only to names at the rank of family, genus or species.

It may effect a change in original spelling, type, or (most commonly) priority.

- Conserved spelling (orthographia conservanda, orth. cons.) allows spelling usage to be preserved even if the name was published with another spelling: Euonymus (not Evonymus), Guaiacum (not Guajacum), etc. (see orthographical variant).
- Conserved types (typus conservandus, typ. cons.) are often made when it is found that a type in fact belongs to a different taxon from the description, when a name has subsequently been generally misapplied to a different taxon, or when the type belongs to a small group separate from the monophyletic bulk of a taxon.
- Conservation of a name against an earlier taxonomic (heterotypic) synonym (which is termed a rejected name, nomen rejiciendum, nom. rej.) is relevant only if a particular taxonomist includes both types in the same taxon.

=== Rejection ===
Besides conservation of names of certain ranks (Art. 14), the ICN also offers the option of outright rejection of a name (nomen utique rejiciendum) also called suppressed name under Article 56, another way of creating a nomen rejiciendum that cannot be used anymore. Outright rejection is possible for a name at any rank.

Rejection (suppression) of individual names is distinct from suppression of works (opera utique oppressa) under Article 34, which allows for listing certain taxonomic ranks in certain publications that are considered not to include any validly published names.

=== Effects ===
Conflicting conserved names are treated according to the normal rules of priority. Separate proposals (informally referred to as "superconservation" proposals) may be made to protect a conserved name that would be overtaken by another. However, conservation has different consequences depending on the type of name that is conserved:

- A conserved family name is protected against all other family names based on genera that are considered by the taxonomist to be part of the same family.
- A conserved genus or species name is conserved against any homonyms, homotypic synonyms, and those specific heterotypic synonyms that are simultaneously declared nomina rejicienda (as well as their own homotypic synonyms). As taxonomic changes are made, other names may require new proposals for conservation and/or rejection.

=== Documentation ===
Conserved and rejected names (and suppressed names) are listed in the appendices to the ICN. As of the 2012 (Melbourne) edition, a separate volume holds the bulk of the appendices (except appendix I, on names of hybrids). The substance of the second volume is generated from a database that also holds a history of published proposals and their outcomes, the binding decisions on whether a name is validly published (article 38.4) and on whether it is a homonym (article 53.5). The database can be queried online.

=== Procedure ===
1. The procedure starts by submitting a proposal to the journal Taxon (published by the IAPT). This proposal should present the case both for and against conservation of a name. Publication notifies anybody concerned that the matter is being considered and makes it possible for those interested to write in. Publication is the start of the formal procedure: it counts as referring the matter "to the appropriate Committee for study" and Rec 14A.1 comes into effect. The name in question is (somewhat) protected by this Recommendation ("... authors should follow existing usage as far as possible ...").
2. After reviewing the matter, judging the merits of the case, "the appropriate Committee" makes a decision either against ("not recommended") or in favor ("recommended"). Then the matter is passed to the General Committee.
3. After reviewing the matter, mostly from a procedural angle, the General Committee makes a decision, either against ("not recommended") or in favor ("recommended"). At this point Article 14.16 comes into effect. Art 14.16 authorizes all users to indeed use that name.
4. The General Committee reports to the Nomenclature Section of the International Botanical Congress, stating which names (including types and spellings) it recommends for conservation. Then, by Div.III.1, the Nomenclature Section makes a decision on which names (including types, spellings) are accepted into the Code. At this stage the de facto decision is made to modify the Code.
5. The Plenary Session of that same International Botanical Congress receives the "resolution moved by the Nomenclature Section of that Congress" and makes a de jure decision to modify the Code. By long tradition this step is ceremonial in nature only.

In the course of time there have been different standards for the majority required for a decision. However, for decades the Nomenclature Section has required a 60% majority for an inclusion in the Code, and the Committees have followed this example, in 1996 adopting a 60% majority for a decision.

== Zoology ==
For zoology, the term "conserved name", rather than "nomen conservandum", is used in the International Code of Zoological Nomenclature, although informally both terms are used interchangeably.

In the glossary of the International Code of Zoological Nomenclature (the code for names of animals, one of several nomenclature codes), this definition is given:

conserved name
A name otherwise unavailable or invalid that the Commission, by the use of its plenary power, has enabled to be used as a valid name by removal of the known obstacles to such use.

This is a more generalized definition than the one for nomen protectum, which is specifically a conserved name that is either a junior synonym or homonym that is in use because the senior synonym or homonym has been made a nomen oblitum ("forgotten name").

An example of a conserved name is the dinosaur genus name Pachycephalosaurus, which was formally described in 1943. Later, Tylosteus (which was formally described in 1872) was found to be the same genus as Pachycephalosaurus (a synonym). By the usual rules, the genus Tylosteus has precedence and would normally be the correct name. But the International Commission on Zoological Nomenclature (ICZN) ruled that the name Pachycephalosaurus was to be given precedence and treated as the valid name, because it was in more common use and better known to scientists.

The ICZN's procedural details are different from those in botany, but the basic operating principle is the same, with petitions submitted to the commission for review.

== See also ==
- Opinion 2027, an example of name conservation as applied by ICZN
- Glossary of scientific naming
