= Ficus subapiculata =

Scientific classification
- Kingdom: Plantae
- Clade: Tracheophytes
- Clade: Angiosperms
- Clade: Eudicots
- Clade: Rosids
- Order: Rosales
- Family: Moraceae
- Genus: Ficus
- Species: F. subapiculata

Binomial name
- Ficus subapiculata (Miq.) Miq.

Synonyms
- Ficus americana subsp. subapiculata (Miq.) C.C.Berg; Urostigma subapiculatum Miq.

Species of flowering plant

Ficus subapiculata is a species of flowering plant in the fig family (Moraceae). It is a tree native to the tropical South America, ranging from Colombia, Ecuador, and Peru through northern Brazil to French Guiana. It grows in Amazon rainforest in light, sandy lowland soils.

The species was first described as Urostigma subapiculatum by Friedrich Anton Wilhelm Miquel in 1853. In 1867 Miquel placed the species in genus Ficus as F. subapiculata.
