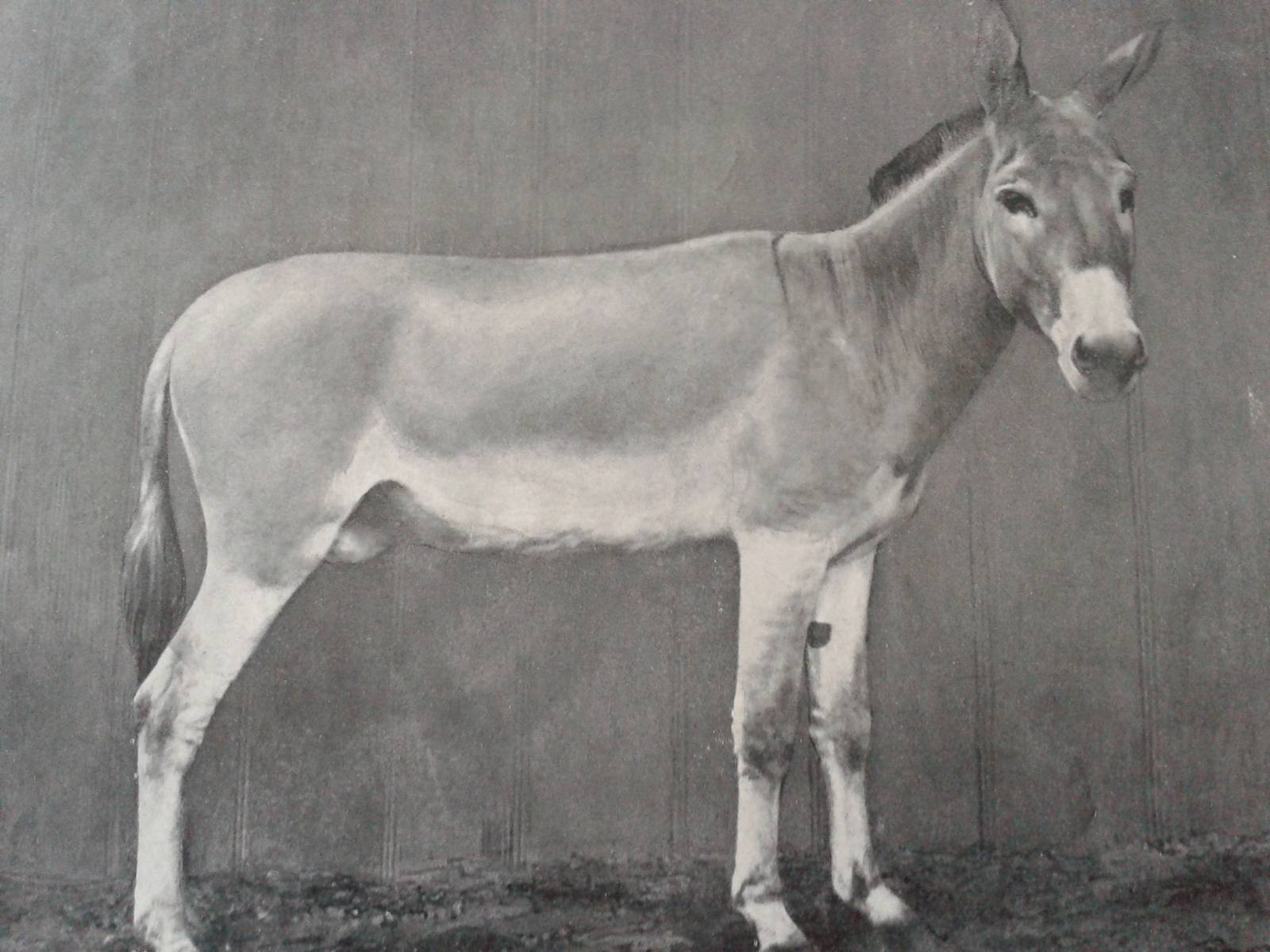
- Nubian wild ass at Berlin Zoo, 1899.

Conservation status
- Critically Endangered (IUCN 3.1)

Scientific classification
- Domain: Eukaryota
- Kingdom: Animalia
- Phylum: Chordata
- Class: Mammalia
- Order: Perissodactyla
- Family: Equidae
- Genus: Equus
- Species: E. africanus
- Subspecies: E. a. africanus

Trinomial name
- Equus africanus africanus (von Heuglin & Fitzinger, 1866)

Synonyms
- Equus africanus dianae (Dollman, 1935); Equus asinus africanus (Grubb, 2005)

= Nubian wild ass =

Subspecies of African wild ass

The Nubian wild ass (Equus africanus africanus) is the nominate subspecies of African wild ass, and one of the ancestors of the domestic donkey, which was domesticated about 6,000 years ago. It is presumed to be extinct, though two populations potentially survive on the Caribbean island of Bonaire and in Gebel Elba.

== Description ==
According to Groves & Chubb, Nubian wild asses had longer ears than the Somali wild ass, ranging from 182-245mm in length. These animals also possessed the "cross-pattern" famous in domestic donkeys but absent in the Somali subspecies, and lacked the "zebra-stripe-pattern" on the legs as found in Somali specimens.

== Habitat and distribution ==
Nubian wild asses lived in the Nubian Desert of northeastern Sudan, from east of the Nile River to the Red Sea and south to the Atbarah River and northern Eritrea.

== Extinction and potential survival ==
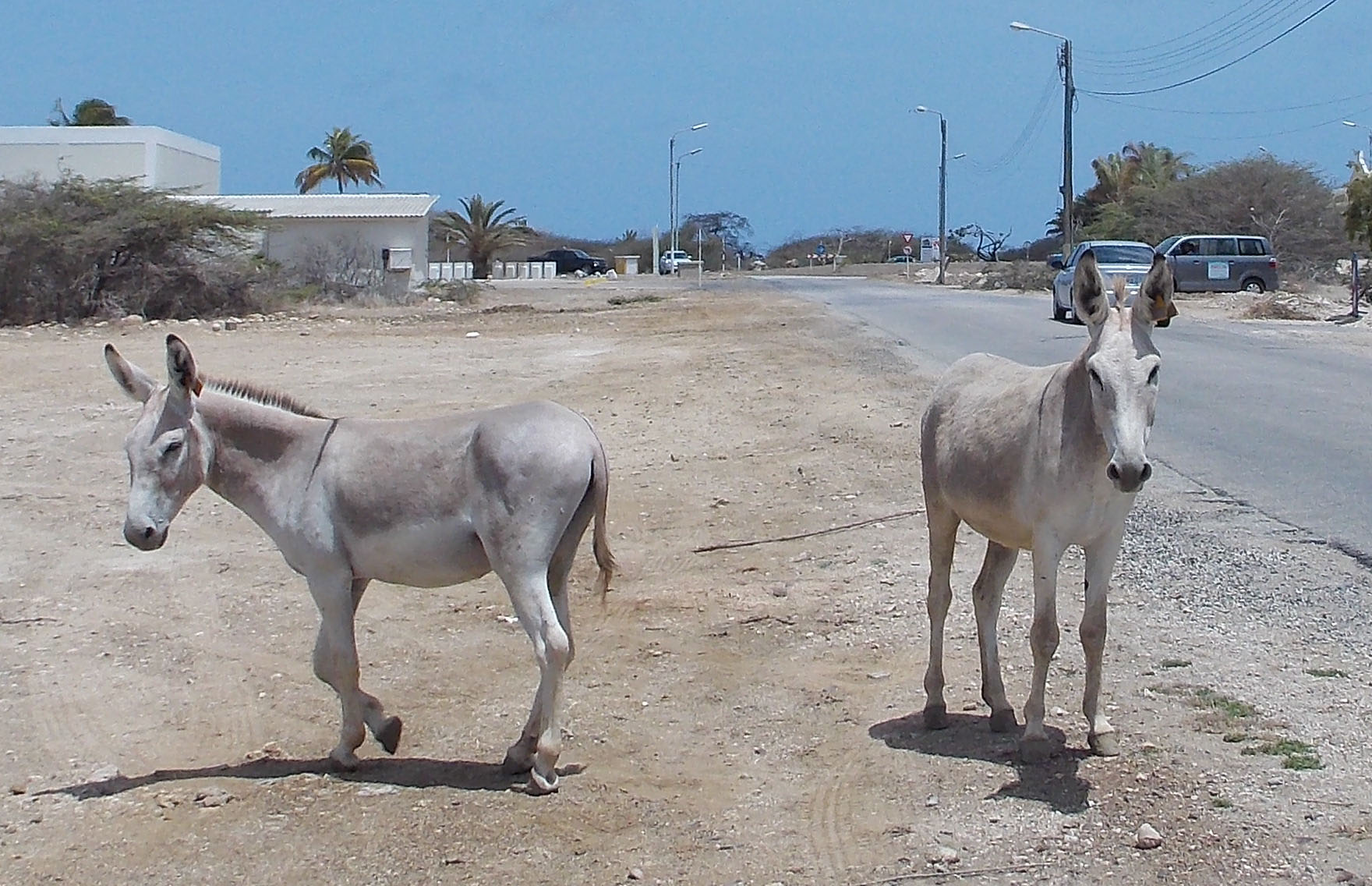
Possible Nubian wild asses on Bonaire.

The Nubian wild ass has not been seen since the 1950s-70s and is presumed extinct. The last sighting of wild asses in the animal's native range were in the 1970s, in Eritrea's Barka Valley and the border between Eritrea and Sudan, during aerial flights. Similar to the decline of the Somali wild ass, the Nubian wild ass's extinction can largely be attributed to hunting, competition with livestock for limited desert resources, and hybridization with the Domestic donkey.

In 2014–2015, a mitochondrial DNA analysis was conducted on a population of feral donkeys on the Caribbean island of Bonaire. The study included DNA samples from the Bonaire animals, museum specimens of Nubian wild asses, sequences from four Somali wild asses, and a sequence from one Domestic donkey, used as a control. The results found that the Bonaire animals were very close to known pure Nubian wild asses and very different from other asses. However, research published in 2010 found that modern donkeys are descended from two lineages of wild ass, one being Nubian and the other being of unknown ancestry. This being the case, the fact that only one donkey was used in the test suggests that the findings are rather inconclusive. For more conclusive results to be found, more testing must be completed with a larger group of donkeys. Additionally, the analysis was a result of an outcry over the government of Bonaire planning a cull of the feral animals, leading to the possibility of the results being slightly biased towards shutting down the cull.

The Gebel Elba National Park, near the border of Egypt and Sudan, is claimed to be home to a wild population of Nubian wild asses. However, the purity of the animals in question has yet to be studied.
