= Ficus guianensis =

Scientific classification
- Kingdom: Plantae
- Clade: Tracheophytes
- Clade: Angiosperms
- Clade: Eudicots
- Clade: Rosids
- Order: Rosales
- Family: Moraceae
- Genus: Ficus
- Species: F. guianensis

Binomial name
- Ficus guianensis Desv.

Synonyms
- Ficus americana subsp. guianensis (Desv.) C.C.Berg; Ficus chiribiquetensis Dugand; Ficus chocoensis Dugand; Ficus erratica Standl.; Ficus estanislana Dugand; Ficus grenadensis Warb.; Ficus mensalis Standl.; Ficus myriasycea Pittier; Ficus oblanceolata Rusby; Ficus parkeriana (Miq.) Sandwith; Ficus rigidifolia Pittier; Ficus subaporuloides Warb. ex Glaz.; Ficus sylvestris Miq.; Ficus umbonigera Warb.; Pharmacosycea parkeriana Miq.

Species of flowering plant

Ficus guianensis is a species of flowering plant in the family Moraceae. It is a tree native to the tropical Americas, ranging from Panama and the Windward Islands through tropical South America to Bolivia and southeastern Brazil.

The species was first described by Nicaise Auguste Desvaux in 1825.
