= Yotvata Hai-Bar Nature Reserve =

Wildlife breeding and reintroduction reserve in Israel

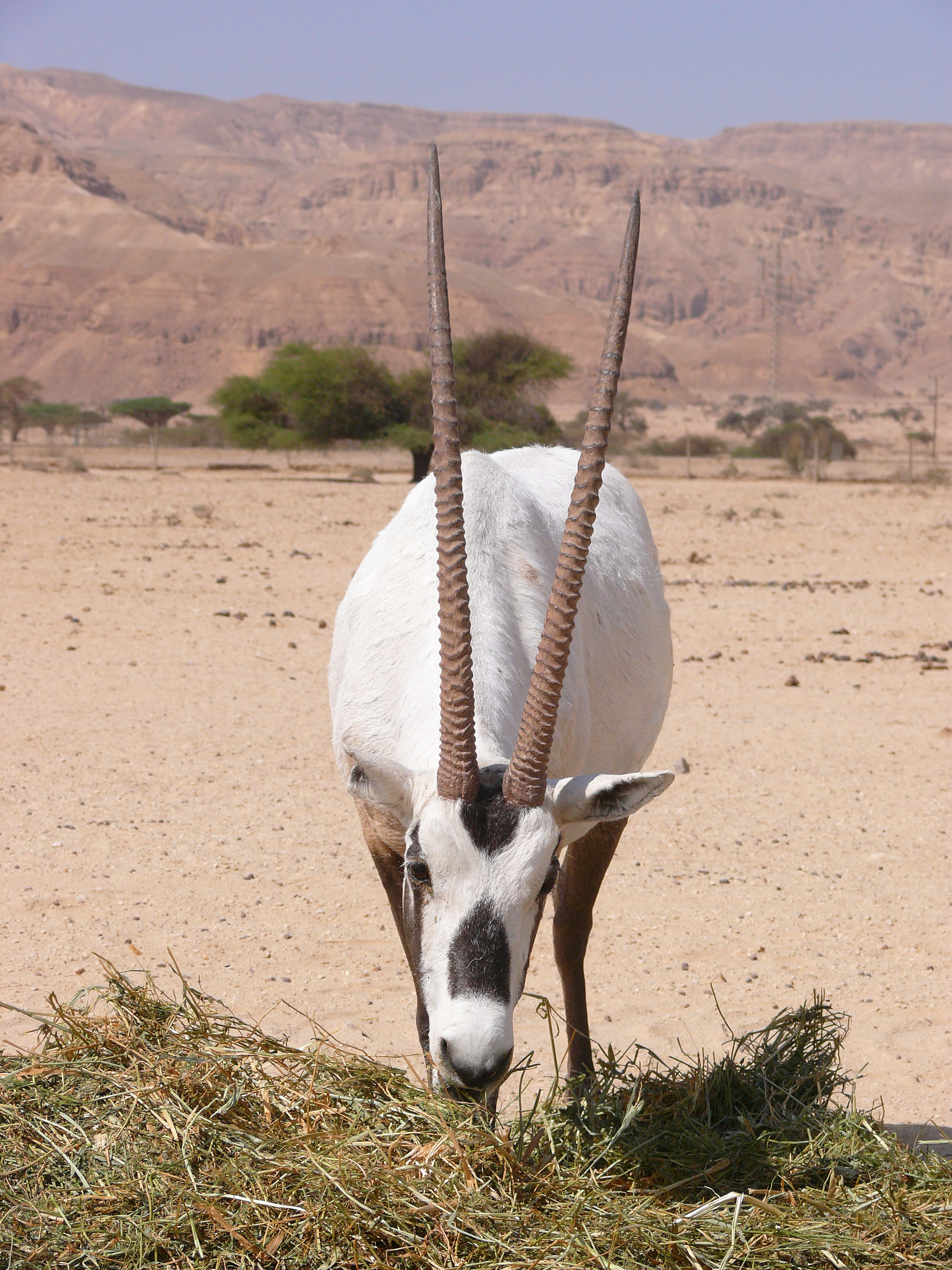
- Arabian oryx at Yotvata Hai-Bar

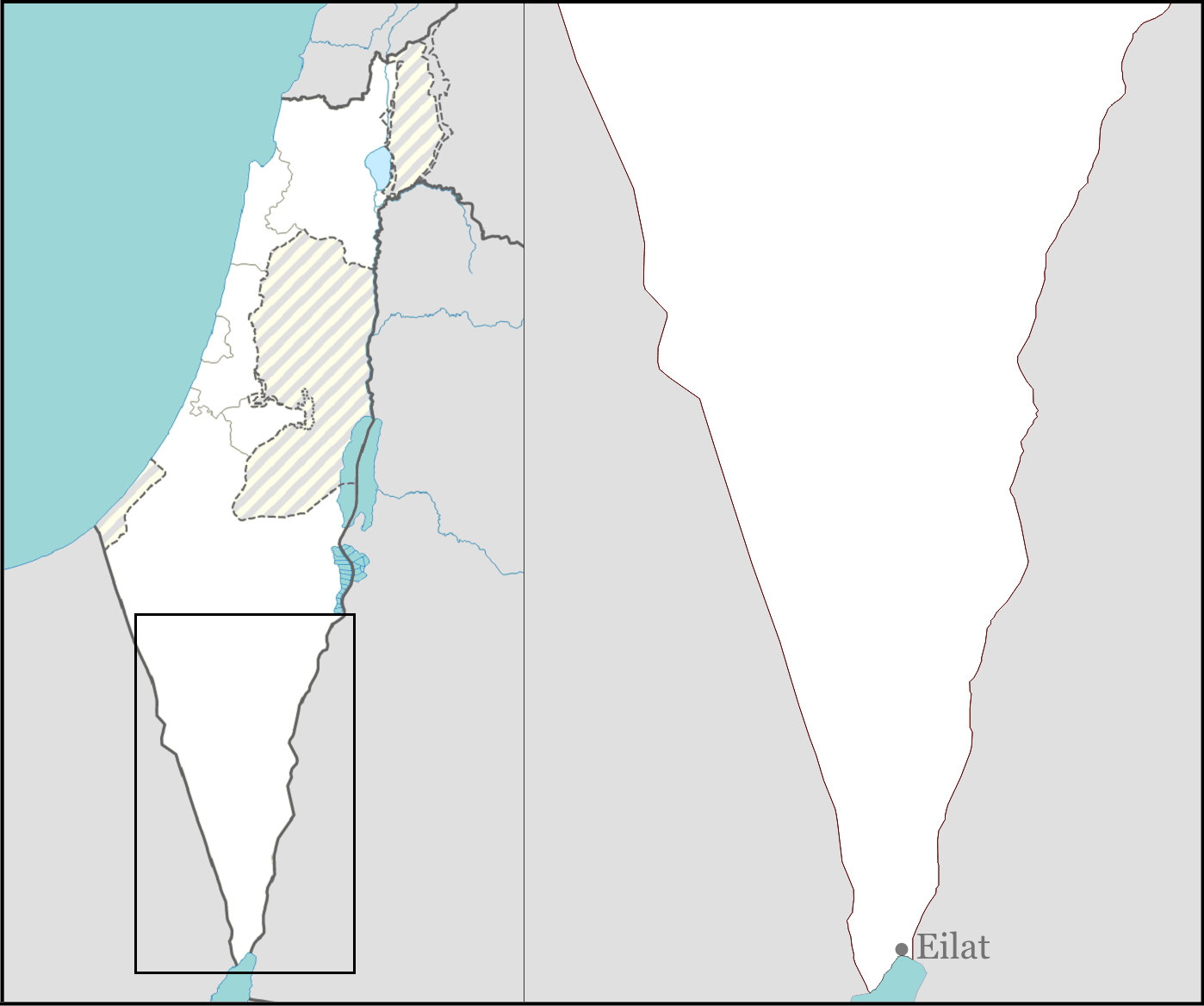
- Location within Southern Negev region of Israel
- Location: Southern Arava, Israel
- Coordinates: 29.871406°N 35.050292°E
- Area: 3,000 acres (1,200 ha)
- Governing body: Israel Nature Reserves & National Parks Authority

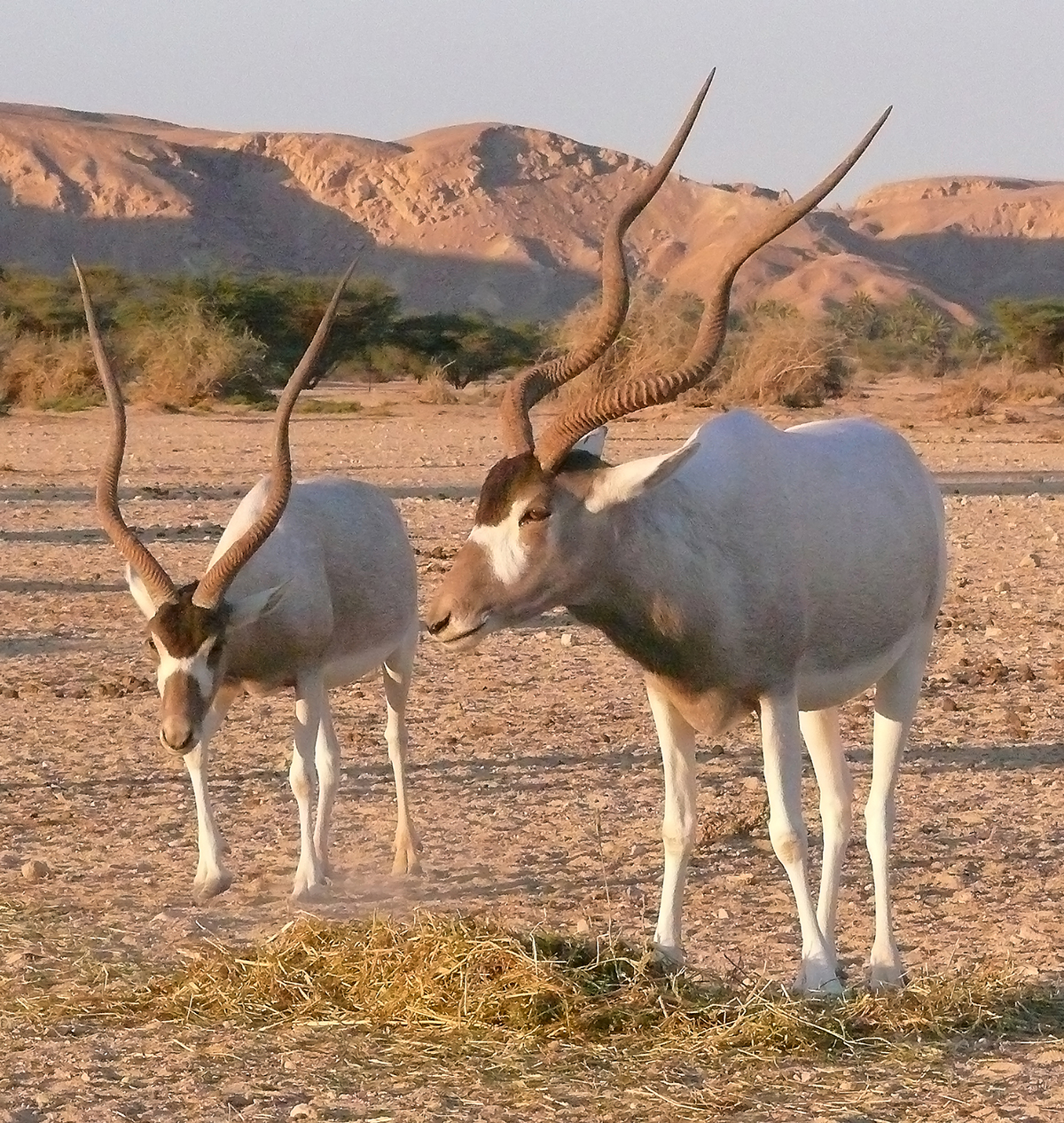
Two Addax near sunset

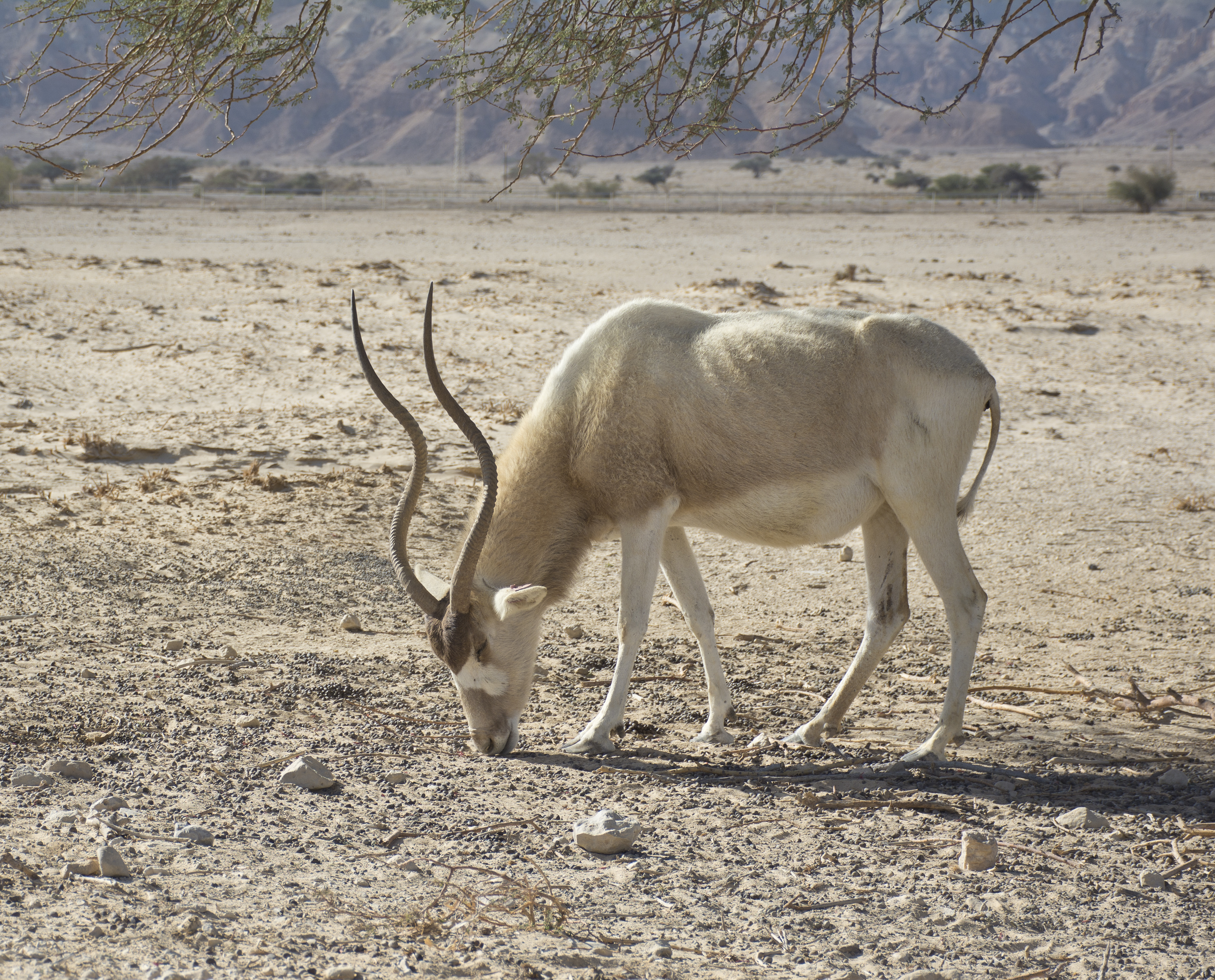
Addax nasomaculatus, 2021

The Yotvata Hai-Bar Nature Reserve (Hebrew: שמורת טבע חי-בר יוטבתה) is a 3,000-acre (12 km^{2}) breeding and reacclimation center administered by the Israel Nature Reserves & National Parks Authority, situated in the Southern Arava near Yotvata.

The Yotvata Hai-Bar is the desert counterpart of the Carmel Hai-Bar Nature Reserve which operates in the country's Northern Mediterranean forest.

Endangered and locally extinct animals mentioned in the Bible are bred here for possible reintroduction to the Negev desert. The Asian wild ass has already been reintroduced in the Makhtesh Ramon area of the wild, while the Arabian oryx has been reintroduced to the northern Arava. In addition the park has some rare desert animals, which are not native to Israel, like the scimitar oryx and the North African ostrich.

Some of the species bred here are:

- Arabian oryx (Oryx leucoryx)
- Scimitar oryx (Oryx dammah)
- Red-necked ostrich (Struthio camelus camelus)
- Addax (Addax nasomaculatus)
- Asian wild ass (hybrids of Equus hemionus kulan and Equus hemionus onager)
- Somali wild ass (Equus africanus somaliensis)
- Dorcas gazelle (Gazella dorcas)
- Arabian gazelle (Gazella arabica)
- Griffon vulture (Gyps fulvus)
- Caracal (Caracal caracal schmitzi)
- Arabian sand cat (Felis margarita harrisoni)
- Arabian leopard (Panthera pardus nimr)
- South African cheetah (Acinonyx jubatus jubatus)
- Arabian wolf (Canis lupus arabs)
- Nubian ibex (Capra nubiana)
- Persian leopard (Panthera pardus tulliana)
- Striped hyena (Hyaena hyaena)
