= EAZA Ex-situ Programme =

Population management and conservation programme

The EAZA Ex-situ Programme (EEP) is a population management and conservation programme by the European Association of Zoos and Aquaria (EAZA) for wild animals living in captivity in European zoos and aquaria. The programme was formerly known as the European Endangered Species Programme.

Each EEP has a coordinator who is assisted by a species committee. The coordinator collects information on the status of all the animals kept in EAZA zoos and aquariums of the species for which he or she is responsible, produces a studbook, carries out demographic and genetic analyses, produces a plan for the future management of the species and provides recommendations to participating institutions. Together with the EAZA Species Committee, recommendations are made each year about relocating and breeding animals, and the conditions of such a move (breeding loan, exchange, term free disposition, etc.).

Even though EEP participation is mainly reserved for EAZA zoos, it is possible for non-EAZA collections to be included in these programmes. There are generally however more restrictions on such zoos (which may go as far as only holding non-breeding animals for educational purposes), and on the number of programmes they may participate in.

== Necessity of international cooperation in breeding programmes ==
For zoo visitors to have the opportunity to see how wild animals look, live, and behave, zoos must ensure that truly wild animals, with all of their natural characteristics, are presented. Zoo animals are vulnerable to three breeding problems inherent to small, artificial populations: inbreeding depression, loss of genetic variability, and accumulation of deleterious mutations. These problems can easily result in loss of original wild traits and in the expression of heritable abnormalities. If what was once a pure, wild population of animals deteriorates through generations of uncontrolled breeding into inferior or partially domesticated stock, then the animals are no longer suitable for any conservation effort, and the zoos have failed to perform an important educational task.

The effects of breeding captive populations of wild animals over periods of many generations have been well studied. Based on these studies and genetic theory, guidelines for breeding such small populations have been developed. Following such guidelines should sharply reduce possibilities of breeding problems and concurrently should maximize the number of generations in which the original founding diversity can be maintained. Guidelines for captive populations follow some basic principles including beginning with as many "founders" as possible (preferably at least 20-30 of animals), increase the number of individuals within the population rapidly, all individuals from the founder population should have "equal genetic representation" and inbreeding should be avoided. The application of these guidelines, and many others tailored to specific populations, results in strictly controlled breeding programmes in which nothing is left to chance. Only in this manner can healthy and truly wild populations be maintained over a period of one or two hundred years. Such strict control is entirely dependent on cooperation among zoos that hold individuals of the species, as single zoos generally do not have the facilities to maintain a population of adequate size independently.

== The species in the programme ==
As of 2022, over 400 animal species are represented in the EAZA Ex-situ Programme.

=== Examples of the (sub)species ===
==== Sumatran tiger (Panthera tigris sumatrae) ====
One species which has been handled by EEP was Sumatran tiger which have only a few hundred left in the wild, and only about 7% of their habitat remains. They used to live in all the Sumatran territory, but nowadays most of them can only be found in the mountain regions of the Burit Barisan volcanic area. This species is currently threatened with the destruction of habitat and poaching, for trade of its parts in traditional oriental medicine or as a trophy. The Tiger EEP has made contributions to the conservation of Amur and Sumatran tigers in the wild, via fundraising for wild tiger conservation projects, raising awareness and providing educational opportunities, and assisting with relevant research and training. For example, in November 2011, Sumatran tiger Kirana has delivered three cubs at Chester Zoo under EEP which attempts to coordinate breeding between zoos and maintain genetic diversity.

==== Gorilla (Gorilla gorilla gorilla) ====
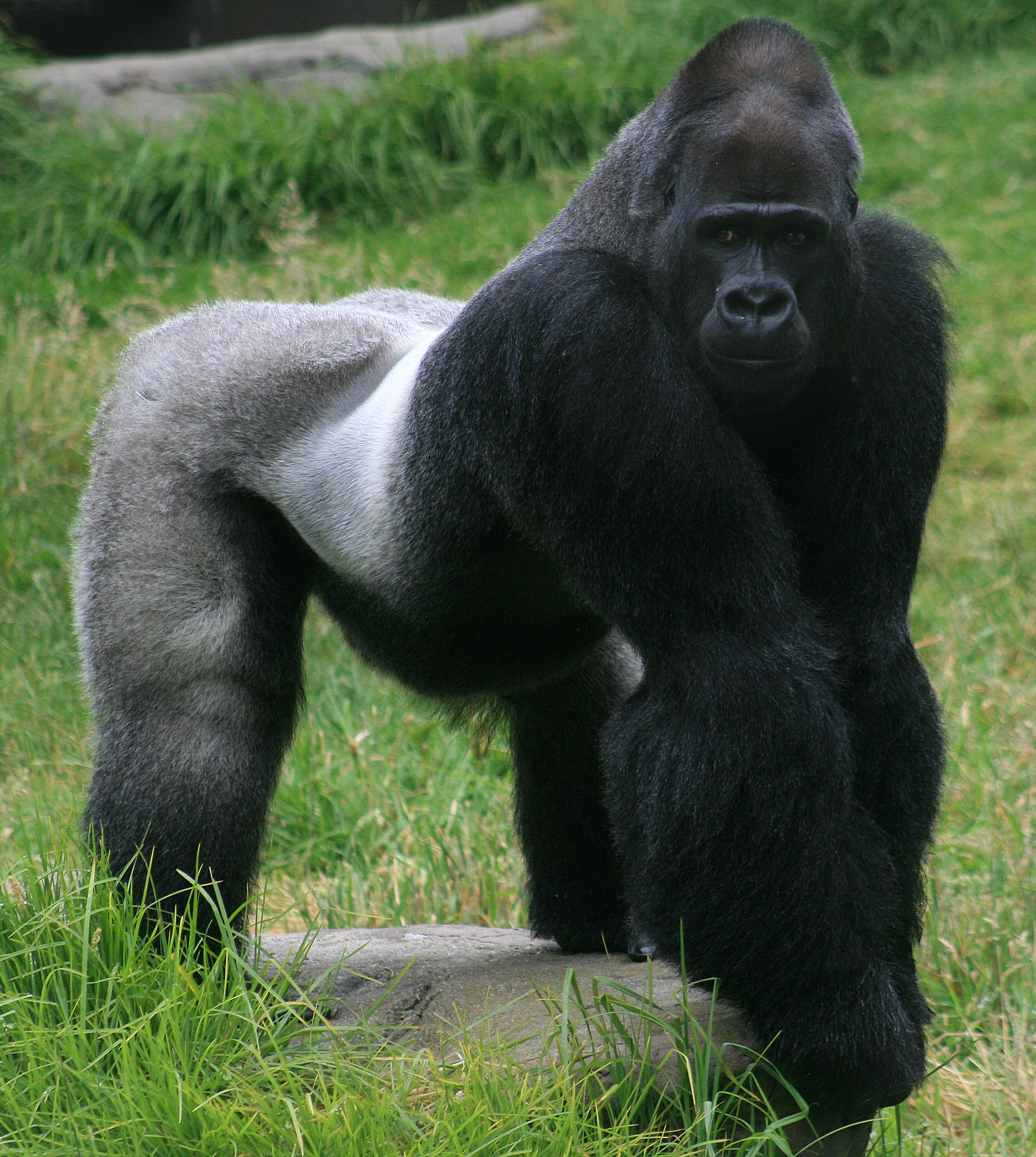
Gorillas are stocky animals with broad chests and shoulders, large, human-like hands and small eyes set into hairless faces.

The Gorilla EEP is one of the most intensively managed and oldest breeding programmes in European zoos. The Gorilla EEP was started in 1987 and was run by the Frankfurt Zoological Garden, who continue to maintain the Gorilla Studbook. In the past decade, some major improvements have been achieved in the management of the EEP for the western lowland gorilla Gorilla gorilla gorilla. Neonatal mortality and hand‐rearing rates have decreased; transfers in most cases proved to be successful: almost all gorillas were integrated into their new groups and most animals introduced to a breeding group had their first offspring within two years. The results show that the current management approach is successful, and that the population is sustainable and has good genetic health.

== Challenges ==
The largest problem encountered in the functioning of the EEP is undoubtedly the actual execution of breeding management recommendations: it is often difficult to develop policies applicable to an entire group of zoos (varying from 10 to well over 50 depending on the species programme) when these are spread throughout several countries with different languages and laws, and with dissimilar political and economic backgrounds. Just the incongruencies in laws can sometimes make exchange of specimens for breeding purposes by two closely situated zoos a formidable task if a border happens to lie between them. Yet successes have been achieved: the growth of the EEP has been considerable since its initiation in 1985.

== EEP Participation ==
EAZA has more than 400 member institutions in 47 countries throughout Europe, Western Asia and beyond. EAZA currently manages EEPs for over 500 different species. More than 300 EAZA members were participating in EEP programmes in 2021.

== Worldwide counterparts ==
EEP is one of the worldwide assembly of such regional breeding programs in zoos for threatened species. The North America counterpart is the Species Survival Plan, and Australian, Japanese, Indian, and Chinese zoos also have similar programs. Combined, there are now many hundred zoos worldwide involved in regional breeding programs.

== See also ==
- European Association of Zoos and Aquaria
- Ex situ conservation
