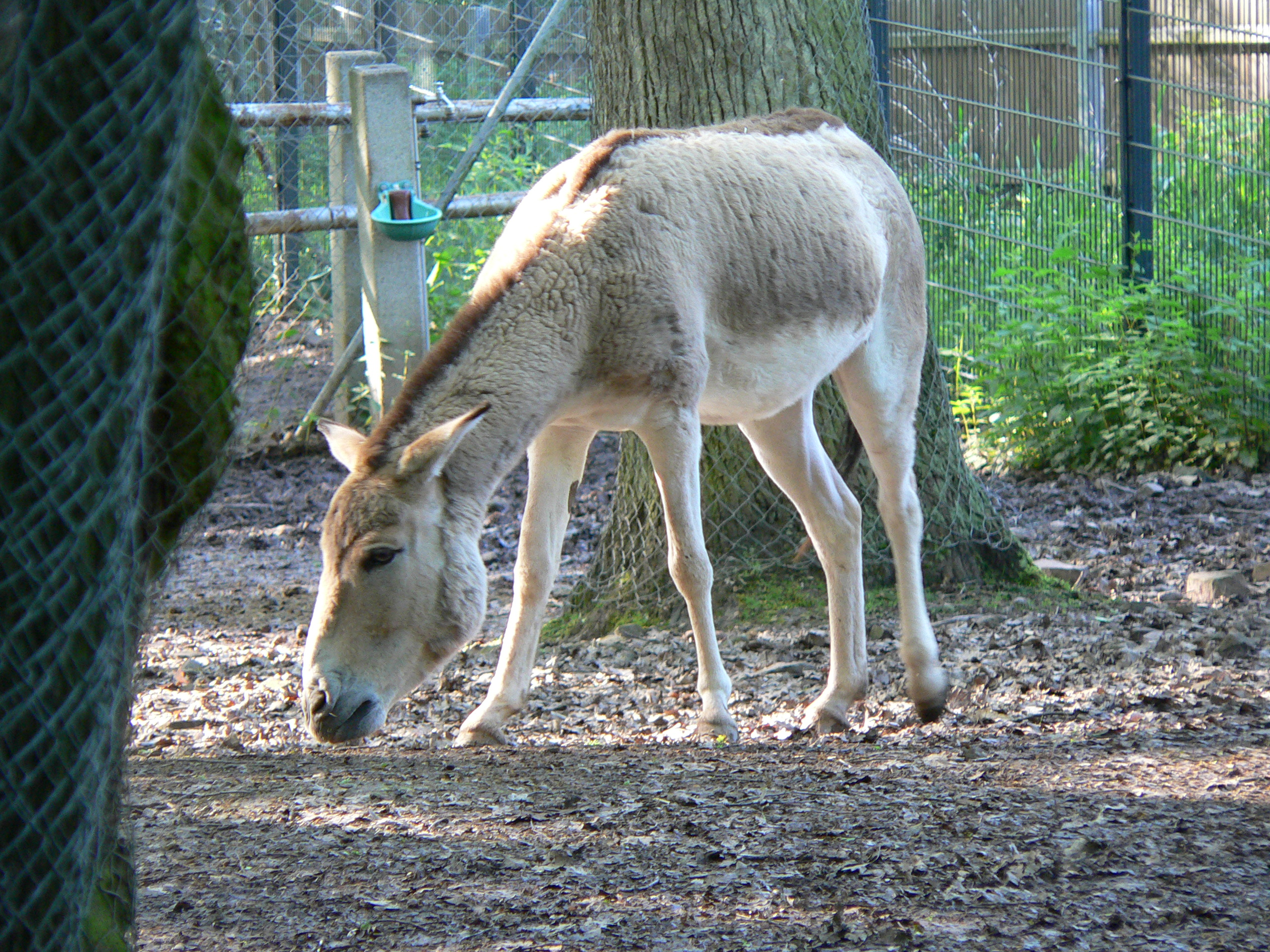
- Turkmenian kulan (Equus hemionus kulan)

Scientific classification
- Kingdom: Animalia
- Phylum: Chordata
- Class: Mammalia
- Order: Perissodactyla
- Family: Equidae
- Genus: Equus
- Subgenus: Asinus; Gray, 1824

Type species
- Equus asinus Linnaeus, 1758

Species
- Equus africanus Equus asinus Equus hemionus Equus kiang †Equus hydruntinus
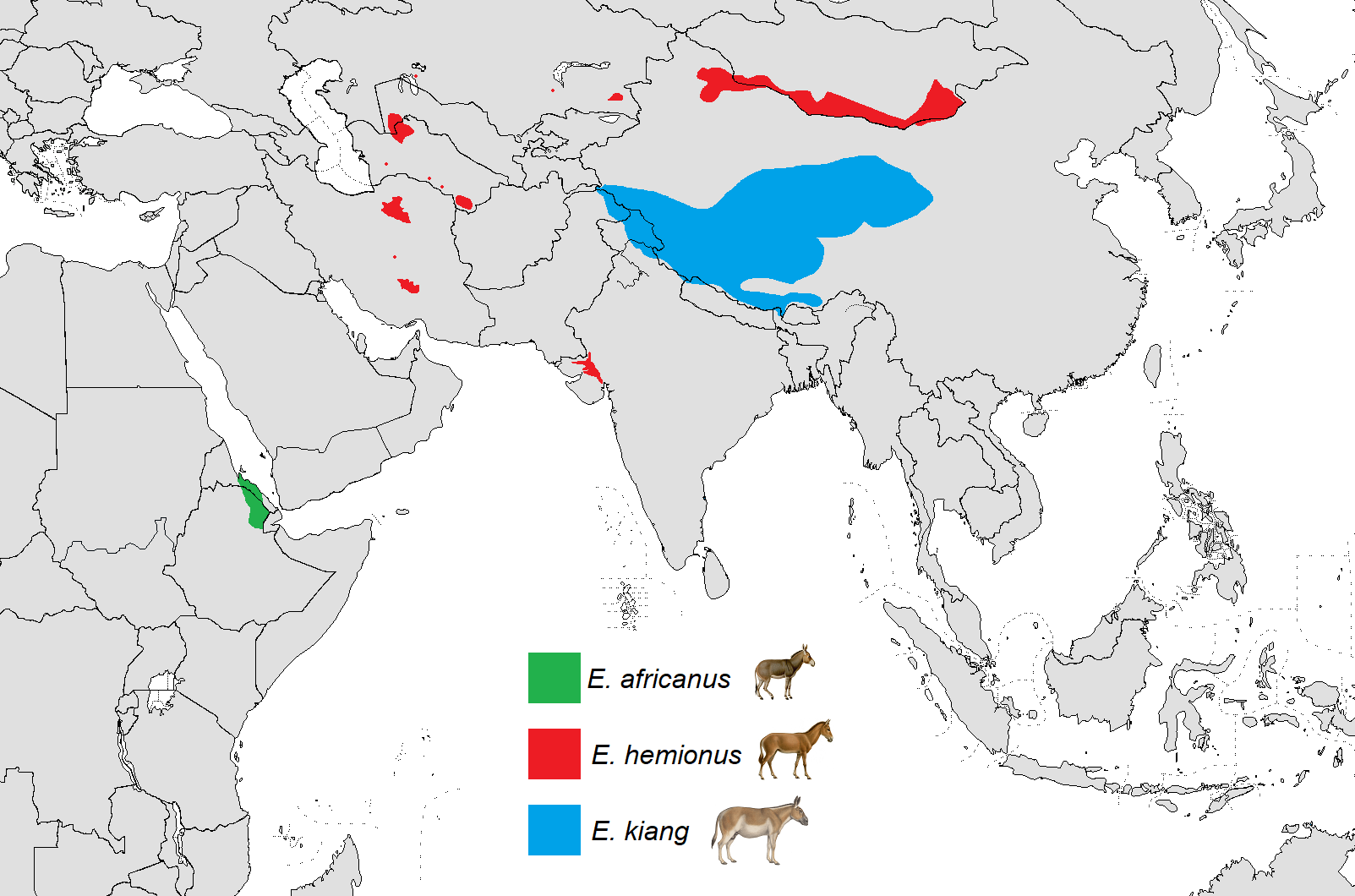
- Range of the three living wild ass species

= Asinus =

Subgenus of mammals

Asinus is a subgenus of Equus that encompasses several subspecies of the Equidae commonly known as wild asses or wild donkeys, characterized by long ears, a lean, straight-backed build, lack of a true withers, a coarse mane and tail, and a reputation for considerable toughness and endurance.

The common donkey is the best-known domesticated representative of the subgenus, with both domesticated and feral varieties. Among the wild ass species, several never-domesticated species live in Asia and Africa, with the extinct European wild ass species formerly inhabiting Europe.

== Taxonomy ==
- Genus: Equus
  - Subgenus: Asinus
    - African wild ass, Equus africanus
      - Nubian wild ass, Equus africanus africanus
      - Somali wild ass, Equus africanus somaliensis
      - Atlas wild ass, †Equus africanus atlanticus (extinct 1st millennium AD)
      - Donkey, Equus africanus asinus
    - Onager or Asiatic wild ass, Equus hemionus
      - Mongolian wild ass or khulan, Equus hemionus hemionus
      - Indian wild ass or khur, Equus hemionus khur
      - Turkmenian kulan, Equus hemionus kulan
      - Persian onager or gur, Equus hemionus onager
      - Syrian wild ass or achdari, †Equus hemionus hemippus (extinct 1927)
    - Kiang or Tibetan wild ass, Equus kiang
      - Western kiang, Equus kiang kiang
      - Eastern kiang, Equus kiang holdereri
      - Southern kiang, Equus kiang polyodon
      - Northern kiang, Equus kiang chu
    - Hydruntine or European wild ass, †Equus hydruntinus (extinct 1st millennium BC)

Cladogram based on whole nuclear genomes after Özkan et al. 2024.

- Asinus (asses)
  - Equus africanus + Equus asinus (African wild ass + domestic donkeys)
  - - †Equus hydruntinus (European wild ass/hydruntine)
    - - - †Equus hemionus hemippus (Syrian wild ass)
        - Equus hemionus onager (Persian onager)
      - - Equus hemionus hemionus (Mongolian wild ass) + Equus (hemionus) kiang (kiang)
