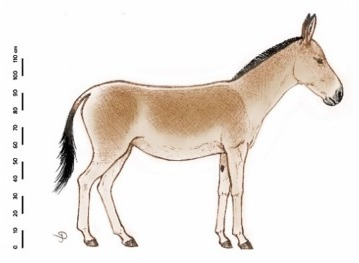
- Life restoration

Scientific classification
- Kingdom: Animalia
- Phylum: Chordata
- Class: Mammalia
- Order: Perissodactyla
- Family: Equidae
- Genus: Equus
- Subgenus: Asinus
- Species: †E. hydruntinus

Binomial name
- †Equus hydruntinus Regalia, 1907

= European wild ass =

European wild ass Temporal range: Middle Pleistocene - Holocene 0.6–0.0025 Ma

Extinct species of mammal

The European wild ass (Equus hydruntinus or Equus hemionus hydruntinus) or hydruntine is an extinct equine from the Middle Pleistocene to Late Holocene of Europe and West Asia, and possibly North Africa. It is a member of the subgenus Asinus, and closely related to the living Asiatic wild ass. The specific epithet, hydruntinus, means from Otranto (Hydruntum in Latin).

== Description ==
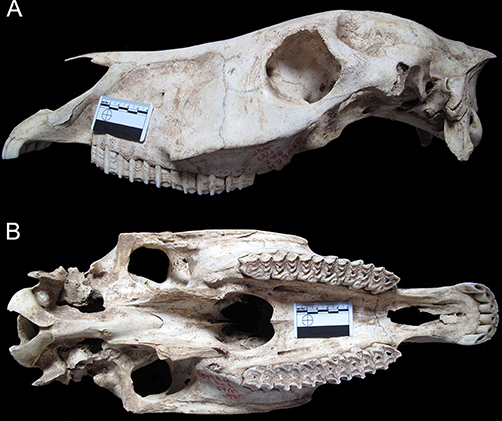
Complete skull from Crimea

In comparison to the Asiatic wild ass (Equus hemionus), the muzzle region of the skull is much shorter and somewhat proportionally wider, the palate is elongate, and the nasal notch is shorter. The teeth are relatively small compared to skull size, but are very hypsodont (high crowned). The shafts of the metacarpal and metatarsal bones are also more robust.

== Evolutionary history ==
Equus hydruntinus appeared first in the fossil record around 600,000 years ago during the Middle Pleistocene. In the Late Pleistocene it was widespread throughout much of western Eurasia from the Middle East to Europe, especially along the Mediterranean, with fossil reports from Italy, Turkey, Spain, France and Portugal. In the east the range apparently stretched at least to the Volga and to Iran. In the north it reached almost to the North Sea in Germany and the British Isles. Some authors suggest that it may have reached North Africa.

Its range fragmented after the Last Glacial Maximum, surviving into the Holocene, its range contracted further, persisting in small regions of southern Europe, including the Danube river valley, the southern Italian Peninsula and southern France, probably surviving latest in Europe around the Danube until around 4000–3000 BC.

While it was historically suggested that the species survived in the southern Iberian Peninsula into the Chalcolithic based on a phalange found at Cabezo Juré in Huelva, Spain, later research found it was more likely that the phalange came from a mule, and thus there are no unambiguous specimens of E. hydruntinus in the Iberian Peninsula that date later than the end of the Late Pleistocene (also corresponding to the end of the Paleolithic). Suggestions that the hydruntine survived into the historical period to be described in written records as the zebro, while popular "despite a total dearth of osteological finds ... during the Holocene", are unfounded.

It likely survived latest in West Asia, with reported dates in that region ranging until 1500–500 BC.

The exact systematic position was formerly unclear but recent genetic and morphological analysis suggested that it is closely related to the Asiatic wild ass. A 2017 genetic study based on a partial mitochondrial genome suggested that it was a subspecies of Asiatic wild ass, closer to the Khur than the Persian onager. However, study of the full mitochondral and nuclear genomes of specimens from Çatalhöyük and Çadır Höyük in Anatolia (present day Turkey) dating to the early-mid 1st millennium BC, which represent the youngest known remains of the species (with the youngest specimen dated to around 2698–2356 cal years Before Present, or around 748–406 cal years BC), suggest that all modern Asiatic wild ass lineages (sensu lato, including the kiang) are more closely related to each other than to E. hydruntinus, with the split between hydruntines and Asiatic wild asses estimated at around 800–600 thousand years ago. Analysis of the nuclear genome suggested that there had been gene flow during the Holocene from the hydruntine lineage into Middle Eastern Asiatic wild asses, with analysis of a genome of Pleistocene specimens from Eastern Europe also suggesting gene flow with Asiatic wild asses in Western Russia.

Cladogram based on whole nuclear genomes after Özkan et al. 2024.

- Asinus (asses)
  - Equus africanus + Equus asinus African wild ass + domestic donkeys
  - - †Equus hydruntinus (European wild ass/hydruntine)
    - - - †Equus hemionus hemippus (Syrian wild ass)
        - Equus hemionus onager (Persian onager)
      - - Equus hemionus hemionus (Mongolian wild ass) + Equus (hemionus) kiang (kiang)

== Ecology ==
The evidence shows that the European ass favoured semi-arid, steppic conditions and showed a preference for temperate climates, although it was also found in cool or cold conditions. It may have retreated to warmer locales during the coldest periods although the relatively short muzzle indicates an adaptation for cold conditions. It preferred open biotopes, between shrubland (favoured by true horses) and grassland (favoured by bovids). It is believed to have shared this habitat with species such as the woolly rhinoceros. It is considered an ecologically important part of the ecosystem known as mammoth steppe where it filled a niche equivalent to that provided by the African wild ass or zebra in the African savanna. Dental wear analysis of specimens from the Iberian Peninsula suggests a primarily grazing diet, though they appear to have been flexible feeders, having seasonally consumed browse. Dental microwear evidence from Late Pleistocene specimens from the Crimean Peninsula likewise reveal it had a diet mainly composed of abrasive grasses. Remains of European wild ass have been found in cave hyena dens, suggesting that they were likely predated upon by them.

== Relationship with humans ==
The hydruntine is depicted in Palaeolithic cave paintings and engravings from France, as well as on Neolithic pottery from Anatolia. Remains found with cut marks and/or in archaeological sites spanning from the Paleolithic to the youngest known remains of the species in the Iron Age across the species range, including Crimea, Italy, the Iberian Peninsula and Anatolia indicated that it was hunted by people, including both modern humans and Neanderthals.

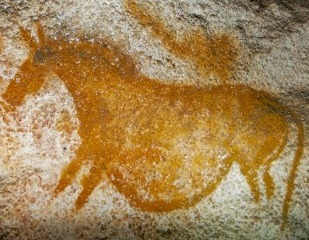
Cave painting from Lascaux cave, France

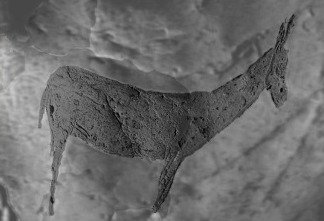
Engraving in the cave Les Trois Frères, France

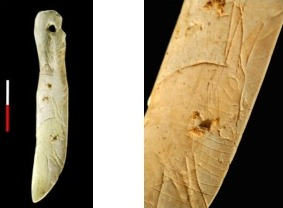
Engraving on a pendant from Putois cave, France

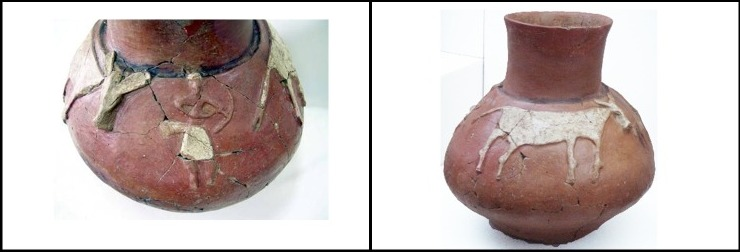
Hunting scene on Neolithic pottery from Turkey

== See also ==
- List of extinct animals of Europe
