= Gur =

Gur or GUR may refer to:

== Places ==
- Gur, Tibet, China
- Gur, Iran
- Gur-e Sefid, Kermanshah, Iran
- Gur (river), Russia
- Gurney Airport (IATA code), Papua New Guinea

== Science and technology ==
- GUR, a form of Ultra-high-molecular-weight polyethylene used for joint replacements
- Gur, the standard abbreviation for the orchid genus Guarianthe
- Persian onager, a subspecies of Asiatic wild ass

== Surname ==
- Gur (surname), Hebrew surname
- Gür, a Turkish given name and surname
- Gúr, Hungarian surname

== Other uses ==
- Gur (Hasidic dynasty)
- Gur languages
  - Farefare language (ISO-639-3 code: gur)
- Jaggery, a sugar product of Bangladesh, India, Pakistan
- Gur cake, a cheap fruit slice popular in Dublin, Ireland
- TCG Gür (S-334), a Turkish submarine
- Gur, an Ancient Mesopotamian unit of measurement
- Main Directorate of Intelligence (Ukraine) (HUR MOU, alternative romanization: GUR, from Ukrainian ГУР), the military intelligence service of the Ukrainian government
