= Gúr =

Gúr is a Hungarian-language surname. Notable people with the surname include:

- Nándor Gúr, Hungarian mechanical engineer and politician
- Roland Gúr, Hungarian politician and lawyer

== See also ==
- Gür, Turkish surname
- Gur, Hebrew surname
