= TCG Gür =

TCG Gür is the name of the following ships of the Turkish Navy:

- TCG Gür (1936), a German-designed submarine in commission until 1947
- TCG Gür (S 334), ex-USS Chub, a Balao-class submarine acquired by Turkey in 1948, decommissioned in 1975

== See also ==
- Gür
