= Al-Muddaththir =

74th chapter of the Qur'an

Surah 74 of the Quran
ٱلْمُدَّثِّر Al-Muddaththir The Cloaked One
- Qira'ah; English text
- Classification: Meccan
- Other names: The Man Wearing a Cloak, The Clothed One, Shrouded, The Enfolded One, The Hidden Secret
- Position: Juzʼ 29
- No. of verses: 56
- No. of Rukus: 2
- No. of words: 256
- No. of letters: 1,035

The Covered (Arabic: ٱلْمُدَّثِّر, al-muddaththir, meaning "the Cloaked One" or "the Man Wearing a Cloak") is the 74th chapter (sūrah) of the Qur'an, with 56 verses (āyāt).

== Summary ==
1-7 Muhammad commanded to rise and preach Islam
8-10 The Judgment Day shall be a sad day for the unbelievers
11-26 God exhorts Muhammad to leave his enemy in his hands
27-29 The pains of hell described
30-34 Nineteen angels set as a guard over hell, and why nineteen are mentioned
35-40 Oath to attest the horrible calamities of hell-fire
41-49 The wicked shall in hell confess their sins to the righteous
50-55 Infidels shall receive no other warning than that of the Quran

== Chronology ==
Many well-known authors' chronologies, including that of Ibn Kathir, place Surat al-Muddaththir as the second surah revealed to the Islamic prophet Muhammad, citing the hadith:

Jabir ibn Abd Allah told, I heard the Messenger of Allah – and he was narrating about the pause in Revelation – so he said in his narration: "I was walking, when I heard a voice from the heavens. So I raised my head, and there was an angel, the one that had come to me at Hira, sitting upon a chair between the heavens and the earth. I fled from him out of fear, and I returned and said: "Wrap me up! Wrap me up!" So they covered me. Then Allah, Most High revealed: "O you who are wrapped up! Arise and warn." Up to His saying: "And keep away from the Rujz!" before the Salat was made obligatory.

Sahih al-Bukhari, Sahih Muslim, Jami` at-Tirmidhi, Musnad Ahmad Ibn Hanbal, etc. Although reports exist of revelation order other than second, the thematic elements of preparation for the Day of Judgment and warnings for the non-believers are consistent with other early Meccan suras. According to Sayyid Qutb's exegesis, the first verses of this surah as well as those of Surah 73 represent Muhammad's earliest revelations and those which prepare him for the ordeal of revelation.

== Structure ==
Surat al-Muddaththir is structured thematically and chronologically. Containing 56 total verses, this surah was most likely revealed on at least two occasions and compiled retroactively. The verses in the surah are short and poetic with the exception of verse 31 because it is explanation of previous verse addressing polytheists and believer's question on the specialty of number 19 in previous verse.

== Major themes ==
There are several distinct thematic sections of this surah. The first is an injunction for self-preparedness. If verse 1 refers to Muhammed (al-Muddaththir, or cloaked one): You, wrapped in your cloak, then the second verse serves to alert Muhammad to a changing environment from which he is charged with saving mankind: Arise, and give warning (74:2). Verses 3-7 are injunctions, then, for him (or whoever follows the righteous path of God) to maintain cleanliness, monotheism, humility, and patience in his own life. These are all preparations for the revelation of the rest of the message.

The next thematic section of Surat al-Muddaththir is a warning for the unbelievers. Verses 8-30 describe the rejection of God's word and the excruciating consequences that result. For he that has not been grateful for the bounty of God's blessing and demands more, disregarding the signs and revelations of God, will be cast into the Saqar, which here refers to the scorching fire of Hell. This image of an unbeliever emphasizes the individuality of the responsibility of obeying God's message: the onus falls upon the individual man to save himself from Hell. Verse 30 refers to nineteen angels who guard the pit of hell; this curious detail is expounded upon in the following verse, which is believed to be a Medinan addition. Some scholars, such as Sayyid Qutb, have stated that verse 31 serves as an explanation of verse 30 that was added after early Muslims and unbelievers alike questioned the specificity of the nineteen angels:

"We have appointed none other than angels to guard the fire, and We have made their number a test for the unbelievers. Thus those who have been granted revelations in the past may be convinced and the believers may grow more firm in their faith; and so those who have been granted revelations and the believers will entertain no doubt; but the sick at heart and the unbelievers will ask, "What could God mean by this image?" Thus God lets go astray whomever He wills, and guides whomever He wills. No one knows your Lord's forces except Him. This is all but a reminder for mankind." (74:31)

Thus, verse 31 explains the mystery of the nineteen angels by portraying the number as a marker of faith. True believers will not question it, as it is the word of God, and those who God has "led astray" will be troubled by doubts. It is possibly an allusion to the Metonic cycle used by the Hebrew calendar.

The next section of Surat al-Muddaththir uses the tangible, accessible physical world as proof that the devastation which awaits the unbelievers will be equally real (74:32-36). It then transitions back to the theme of individual responsibility. Verses 37-47 describe the trial of the soul in Saqar, and the decisions of the individuals who found themselves there. There will be no intercession for them; once they rejected God's word, their eternal souls were doomed (74:48).

Finally, the surah returns to the realm of the living to give its final injunction. Verses 49-56 emphasize the vital need for mankind to fear and glorify God. Having given the believers an image of what happens to those who do not heed the message, the surah ends with a reminder that ultimately, God controls the destiny of all mankind and that nobody will remember what God does not let him. This ultimate authority of God is the final image of Surat al-Muddaththir.

=== The ḥumur and qaswarah ===
Verses 50 and 51 talk about ḥumur (Arabic: حُمُر, 'asses' or 'donkeys') fleeing from a qaswarah (Arabic: قَسْوَرَة, 'lion', 'beast of prey' or 'hunter'). The Asiatic lion and the Syrian wild ass used to inhabit the Arabian Peninsula. Additionally, a reference to the lion in the region of pilgrimage is found in a hadith.

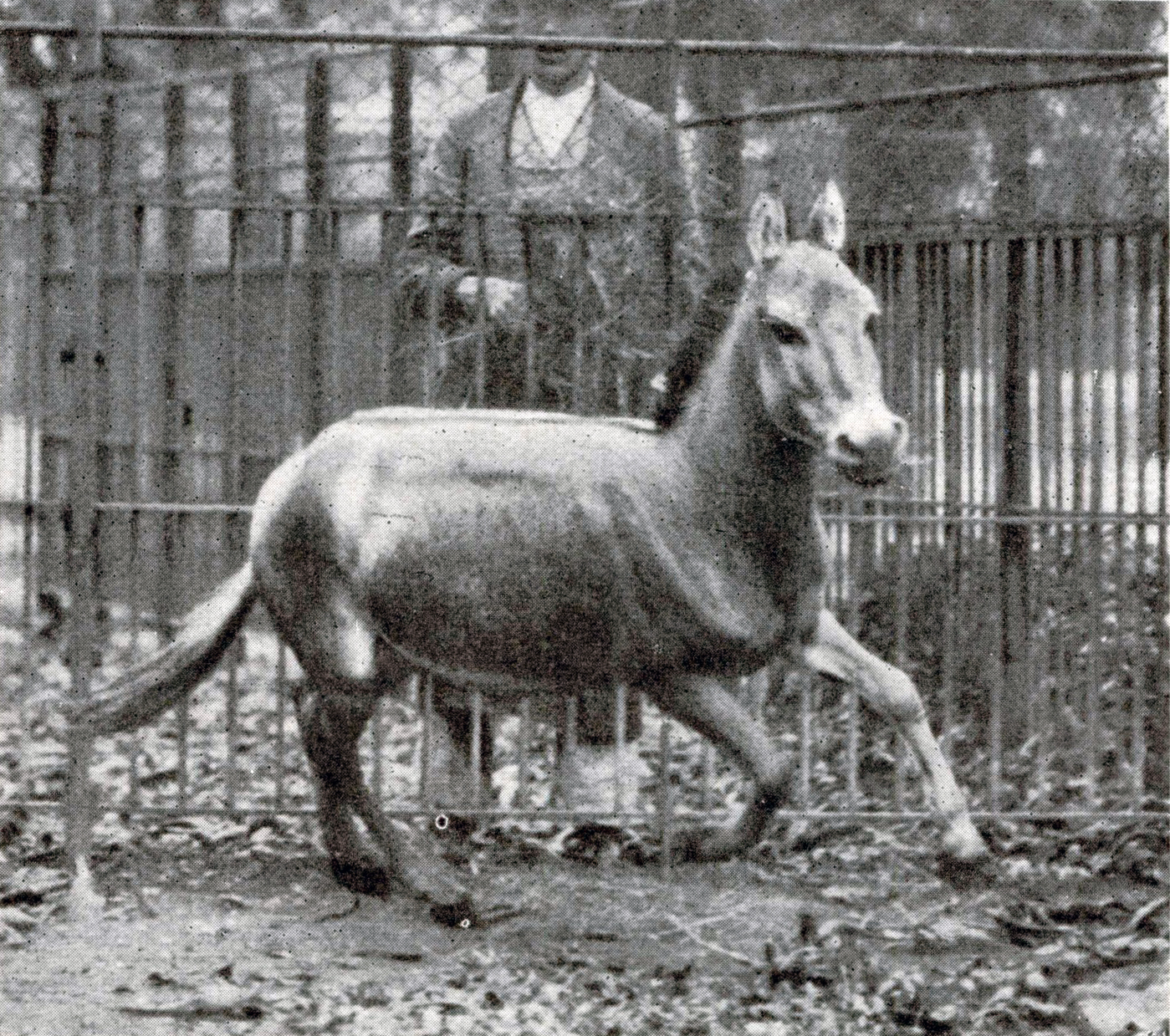
A galloping wild ass in Vienna Zoo, 1915. The local subspecies is now extinct.

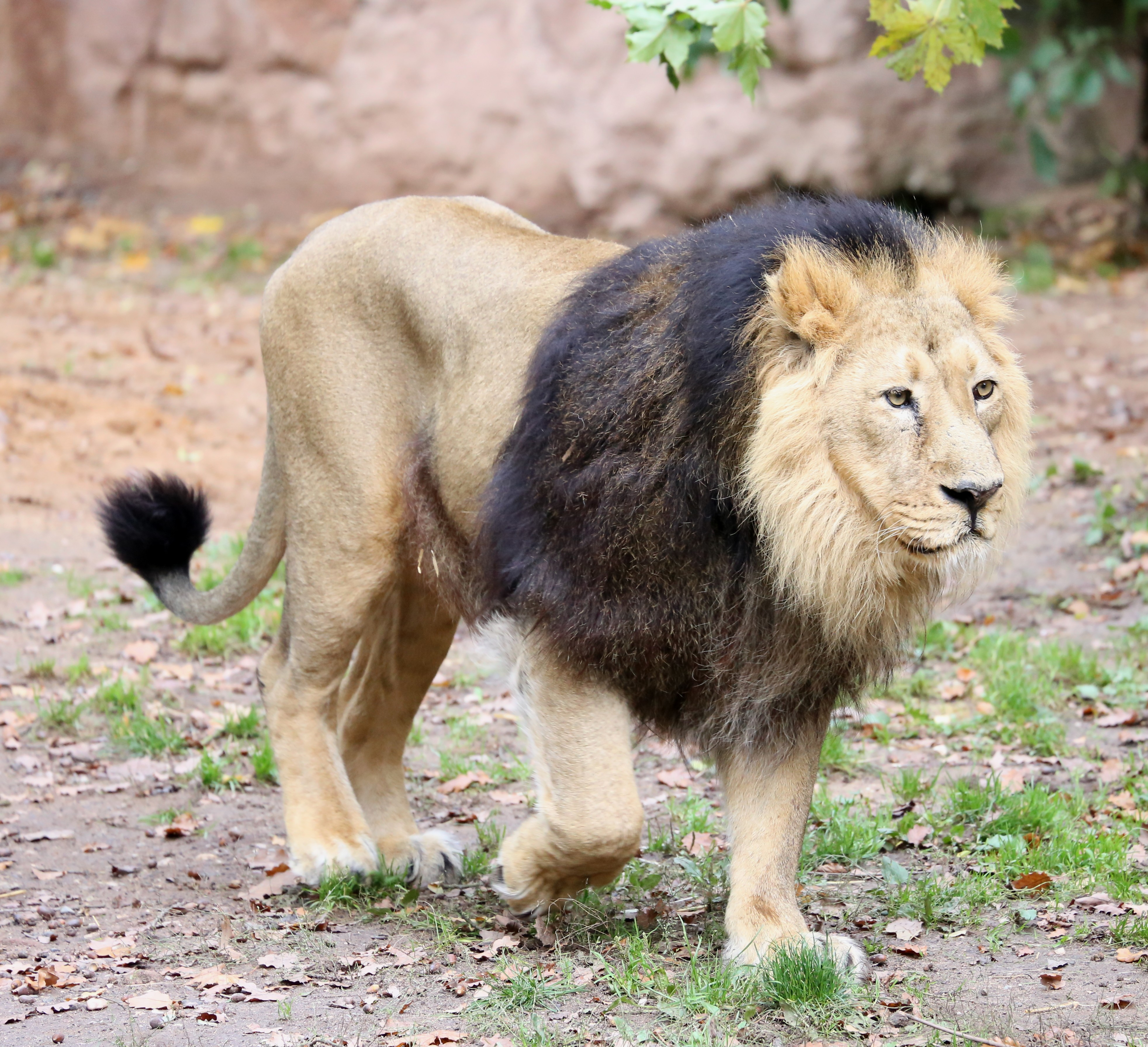
The Asiatic lion, which used to occur in the Arabian peninsula and the Middle East, but currently survives in India

== Names of Muhammad ==
Muddaththir is one of the names or titles of Muhammad. Later, it is used as a male given name spelt as "Mudathir" or "Mudather" in the Arabian Peninsula or Africa, and as "Mudassar" in Central Asia, South Asia and Southeast Asia.

== See also ==
- Prophets and messengers in Islam
