= Gur (surname) =

Gur is a surname of Hebrew (גור) or other possible origins. Notable people with this surname include:

- Aliza Gur (born 1940), Israeli actress
- Batya Gur (1947–2005), Israeli writer
- Efraim Gur (born 1955), Israeli politician
- Haviv Rettig Gur (born 1981), Israeli journalist
- Janna Gur, Israeli food writer
- Mordechai Gur (1930–1995), Israeli politician, Chief of Staff of the Israeli Defense Forces
- Sergei Gur (born 1978), Belarusian kickboxer

== See also ==
- Gür, Turkish surname
- Gúr, Hungarian surname
