= Nándor Gúr =

Hungarian mechanical engineer and politician (born 1957)

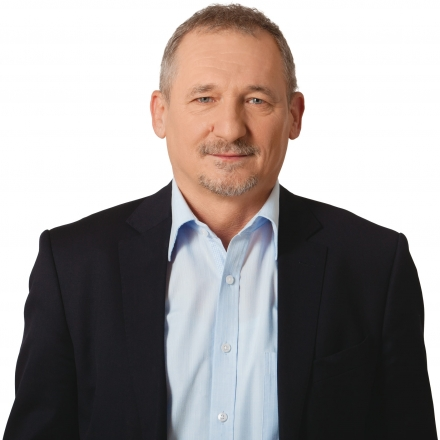

Member of the National Assembly
- In office 15 May 2002 – 7 May 2018

Personal details
- Born: 25 December 1957 (age 68) Miskolc, Hungary
- Party: MSZP (since 1999)
- Other political affiliations: KISZ
- Children: Adrienn; Roland
- Profession: mechanical engineer, politician

Nándor Gúr (born 25 December 1957) is a Hungarian mechanical engineer and politician, member of the National Assembly from the Hungarian Socialist Party from 2002 to 2018.

== Work experience ==
Nándor Gúr finished Bláthy Ottó Secondary Technical School of Heavy Current in Miskolc in 1976. He graduated as a factory-technician production engineer from the Chemical Industry and Automation College Faculty of the University of Miskolc in 1980. He worked for the Machine and Factory Technician Firm of Miskolc as a works manager from 1980 to 1981, then he was the building engineer of ÁFÉSZ Purchase and Sales Cooperative from 1981 to 1986. Parallel to his job he accomplished in 1985 the mechanical engineer diploma, in 1988 the economist engineer diploma of the engineering industry programme within the frame of Mechanical Engineer Faculty of the University of Heavy Industry and Technology of Miskolc.

He was the secretary, later first secretary of the local Hungarian Young Communist League (KISZ) from April 1986 to March 1990, then he was the chairman of the organization in Borsod-Abaúj-Zemplén County. He was the chief desk officer of the County Council from 1989 to 1990. He was head of department, later chief executive of the County Employment Centre from 1991 to 1999. He graduated as a personnel expert from the Budapest University of Economic Sciences in 1996. He was the executive responsible for vocational training and employment policy in the Chamber of Commerce and Industry of Borsod-Abaúj-Zemplén County from 1999 until he became an MP in 2002. He has been the member of Labour Mediation and Arbitration Service since 1996, member of Miskolc Experts' Association since 2002.

== Political career ==
Gúr worked in local government as an external committee member from 1994. He joined the Hungarian Socialist Party (MSZP) in February 1999. He has been on the party's presidium of the Miskolc branch since 2000. He functioned as deputy chairman of the Borsod-Abaúj-Zemplén County Board from 2001. He has also been on the party's National Board since 2000, and was the chairman of the party's Labour and Employment Policy Department from 1999.

He secured a seat in the National Assembly from the party's National List in the 2002 parliamentary election. He became a member of the General Assembly of Borsod-Abaúj-Zemplén County during the local elections on 20 October 2002 where he was the President of the Employment and Enterprise Committee.

In the parliamentary election in 2006, he obtained an individual mandate for Edelény (Constituency VIII, Borsod-Abaúj-Zemplén County). He was elected member of the Committee on Employment and Labour on 30 May 2006. He became chairman of the committee on 17 May 2010. He secured a parliamentary seat from the party's county regional list in the 2010 parliamentary election. He was elected one of the two vice chairmen of the Socialist Party in April 2012, alongside Csaba Horváth.

== Personal life ==
Gur's wife is an auditor, economic engineer and head of the Borsod-Abaúj-Zemplén County Regional Department of the Agricultural and Rural Development Agency (MVH). They have a daughter, Adrienn and a son, Roland Gúr, who became a candidate of the Socialist Party's list for the 2014 European Parliament election.
