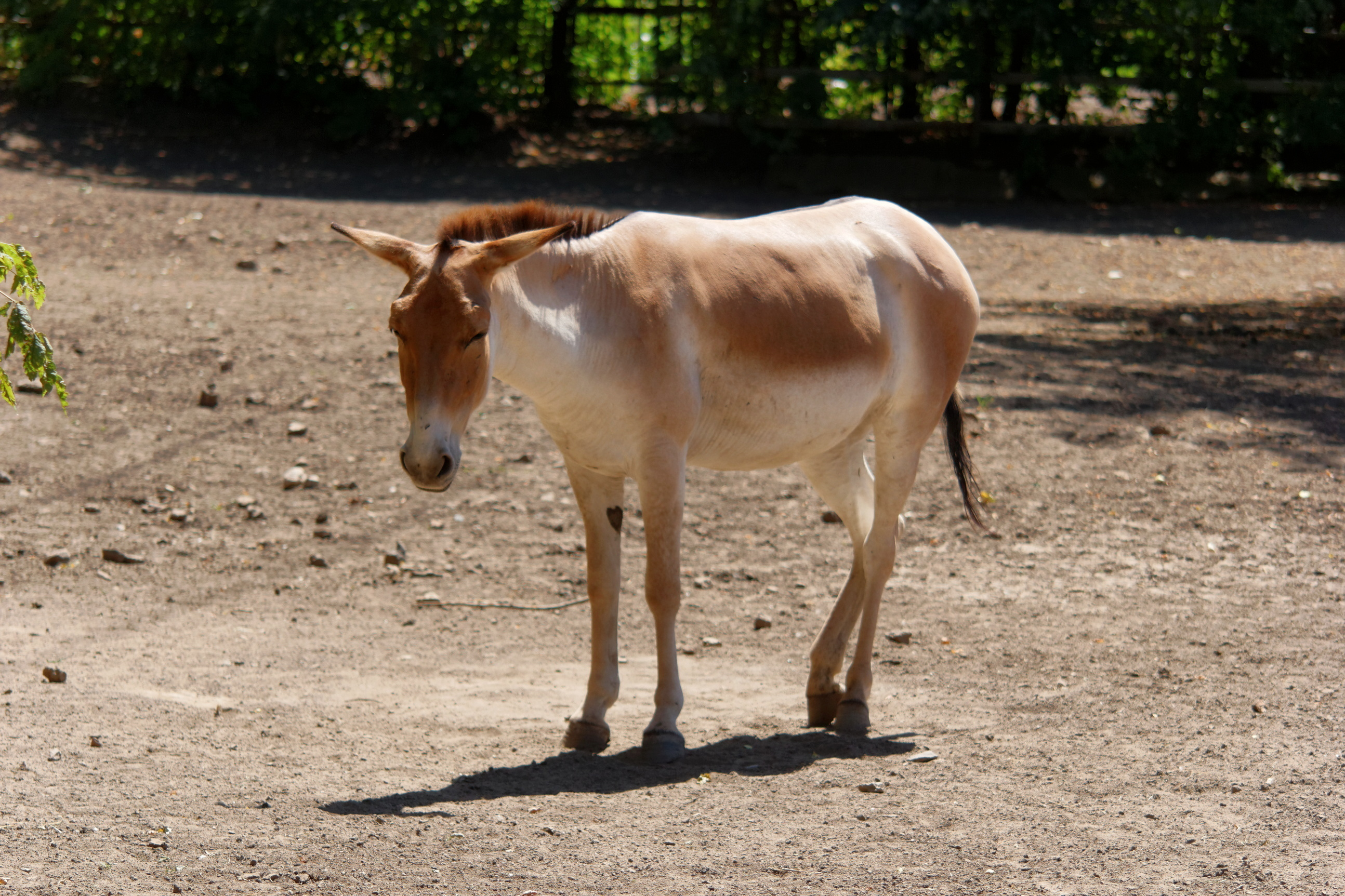
- A Persian onager (Equus hemionus onager) at Rostov-on-Don Zoo, Russia

Conservation status
- Near Threatened (IUCN 3.1)

Scientific classification
- Kingdom: Animalia
- Phylum: Chordata
- Class: Mammalia
- Order: Perissodactyla
- Family: Equidae
- Genus: Equus
- Subgenus: Asinus
- Species: E. hemionus

Binomial name
- Equus hemionus Pallas, 1775

Subspecies
- E. h. hemionus (Pallas, 1775); E. h. kulan (Groves and Mazák, 1967); E. h. onager (Boddaert, 1785); E. h. khur (Lesson, 1827); †E. h. hemippus (Geoffroy, 1855); †E. h. hydruntinus (Regalia, 1907)
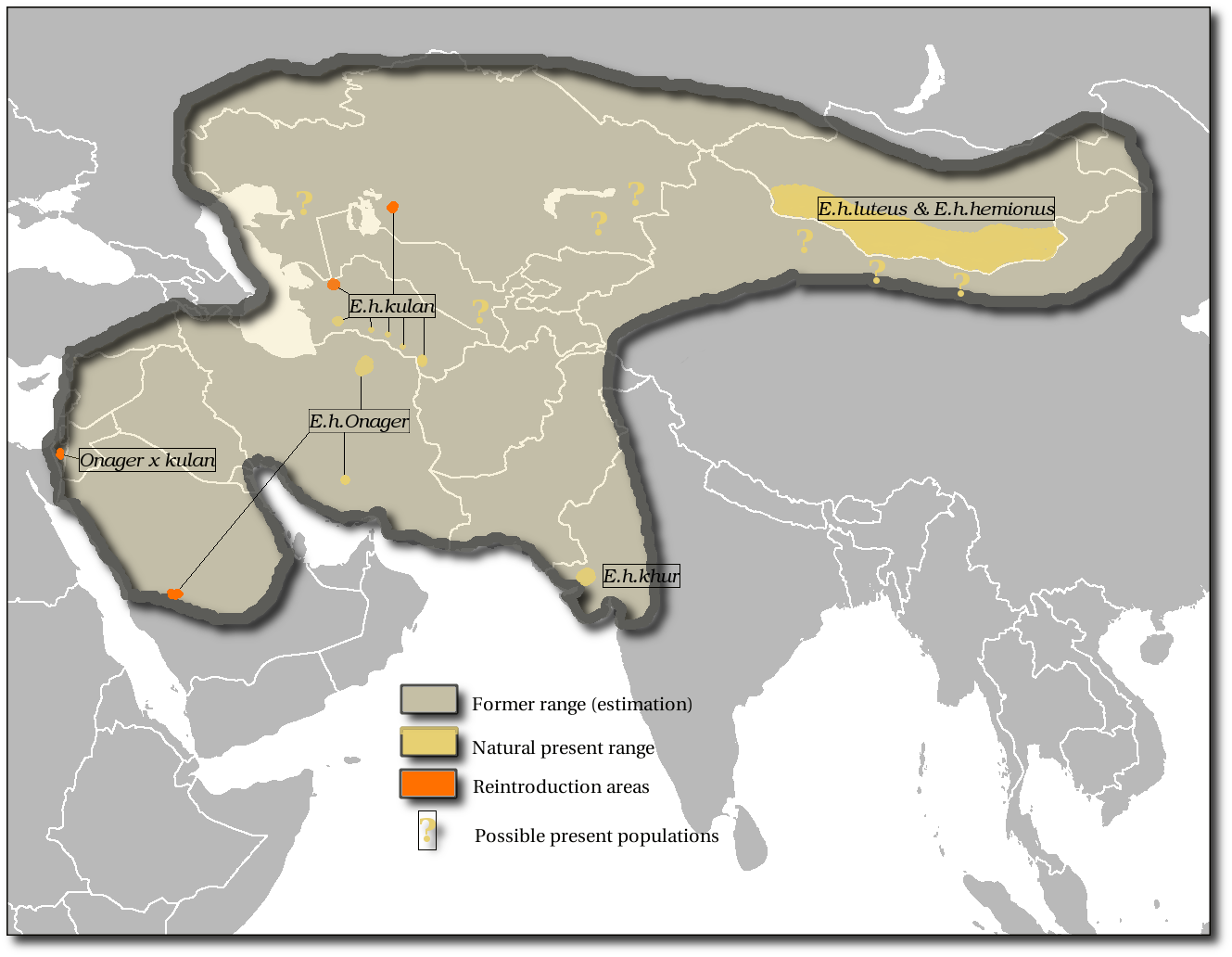
- Onager range

Synonyms
- Equus onager (Boddaert, 1785)

= Onager =

Onager Temporal range: 4.5–0 Ma Early Pliocene – Holocene

Species of mammal

The onager (/ˈɒnəɡər/, /ˈɒnədʒər/) (Equus hemionus), also known as hemione or Asiatic wild ass, is a species of the family Equidae native to Asia. A member of the subgenus Asinus, the onager was described and given its binomial name by German zoologist Peter Simon Pallas in 1775. Six subspecies are accepted.

The onager is reddish-brown or yellowish-brown and has a broad dorsal stripe on the middle of the back. It weighs about 200–260 kg (440–570 lb) and reaches about 2.1 m (6 ft 11 in) head-body length. It is among the fastest mammals, capable of running 64–70 km/h (40–43 mph).

The onager had a wider range from southwest and central to northern Asia including the Levant region, Arabian Peninsula, Afghanistan and Siberia; the prehistoric European wild ass subspecies ranged through Europe until the Bronze Age. During the early 20th century, it lost most of its range in the Middle East and Eastern Asia and lives today in Iran, Kazakhstan, Uzbekistan, Turkmenistan, India, Mongolia and China. It inhabits deserts and arid regions, grasslands, plains, steppes, and savannahs. Like many other large grazing animals, its range has contracted greatly under the pressures of poaching and habitat loss. It has been classified as Near Threatened on the IUCN Red List in 2015. Two subspecies are extinct, two are endangered, and two are near threatened; its status in China is not well known.

== Etymology ==
The first part of the scientific name derives from the Latin word equus which means horse and the second part from the Ancient Greek ἡμίονος, hēmíonos, from ἡμι-, hēmi-, 'half', and ὄνος, ónos, 'donkey'; thus, 'half-donkey' or mule. The term onager comes from the ancient Greek ὄναγρος, again from ὄνος, ónos, 'donkey', and ἄγριος, ágrios, 'wild'.

The onager was commonly known as Asian wild ass, in which case the term onager was reserved for the subspecies E. h. onager, more specifically known as the Persian onager. More recently, the species share the same name, onager.

== Taxonomy and evolution ==
The onager is a member of the subgenus Asinus, belonging to the genus Equus and is classified under the family Equidae. The species was described and given its binomial name Equus hemionus by the German zoologist Peter Simon Pallas in 1775.

Six subspecies of the onager are widely accepted:

Subspecies	Common names	Image	Trinomial authority	Description	Range	Synonyms
Mongolian wild ass; E. h. hemionus; Nominate subspecies	Khulan		Pallas, 1775		Northern China, eastern Kazakhstan, Mongolia, and Siberia	E. h. bedfordi (Matschie, 1911) E. h. findschi (Matschie, 1911) E. h. luteus (Matschie, 1911)
Turkmenian kulan; E. h. kulan	Kulan		Groves and Mazák, 1967	One of the largest onager subspecies, it is 200–250 cm (79–98 in) long, 100–140 cm (39–55 in) tall at the withers, and weighs 200–240 kg (440–530 lb). Male onagers are larger than the females.	Northeastern Iran, Northern Afghanistan, western China, Kazakhstan, southern Siberia, Tajikistan, Turkmenistan, Ukraine, Northern Mongolia, and Uzbekistan	E. h. finschi (Matschie, 1911)
Persian onager; E. h. onager	Gur		Boddaert, 1785		Afghanistan, Iran and Pakistan.	
Indian wild ass; E. h. khur	Khur		Lesson, 1827		Southern Afghanistan, India, southeast Iran and Pakistan	E. h. indicus (Sclater, 1862)
†Syrian wild ass; E. h. hemippus	Hemippe		Geoffroy, 1855	Smallest subspecies, also the smallest form of Equidae	Western Iran, Iraq, Israel, Jordan, Saudi Arabia, Syria, and Turkey	E. h. syriacus (Milne‑Edwards, 1869)
†European ass; E. h. hydruntinus	Hydruntine		Regalia, 1907	Formerly thought to be a distinct species, shown to be a subspecies of the onager by genetic studies in 2017.	Europe, Western Asia	

A seventh possible subspecies, the Gobi khulan (E. h. luteus, also called the chigetai or dziggetai) has been proposed, but may be synonymous with E. h. hemionus.

The Asiatic wild ass has existed for more than 4 million years. The oldest genetic divergence of Equus was the onager, followed by the zebras and onwards. A new species called the kiang (E. kiang), a Tibetan relative, was previously considered to be a subspecies of the onager as E. hemionus kiang, but recent molecular studies indicate it to be a distinct species, having diverged from the closest relative of the Mongolian wild ass's ancestor less than 0.5 million years ago.

- - Syrian wild ass (E. h. hemippus)
  - - Persian onager (E. h. onager)
    - - - Indian wild ass (E. h. khur)
        - Turkmenian kulan (E. h. kulan)
      - Mongolian wild ass (E. h. hemionus)

== Characteristics ==
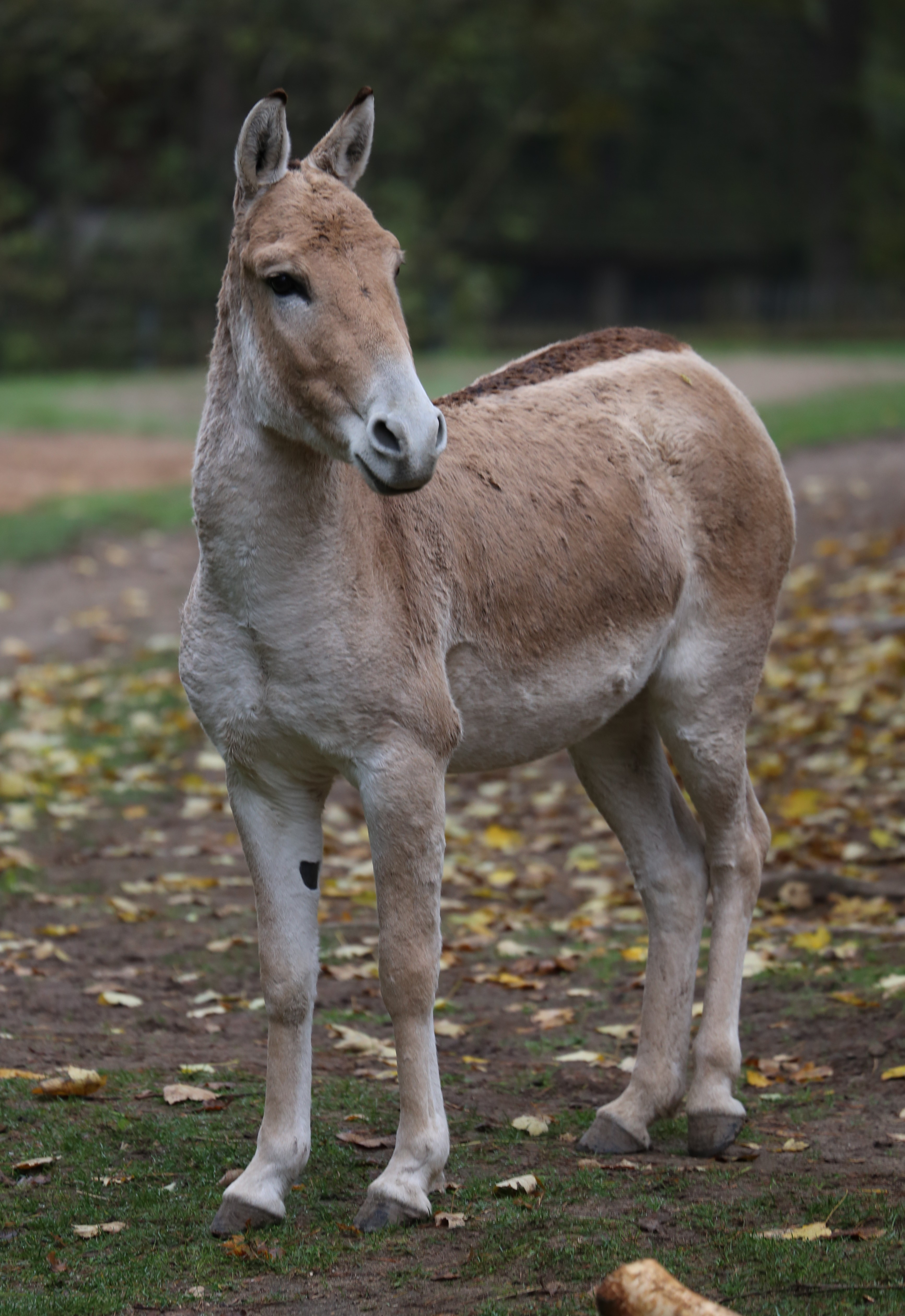
A Turkmenian kulan

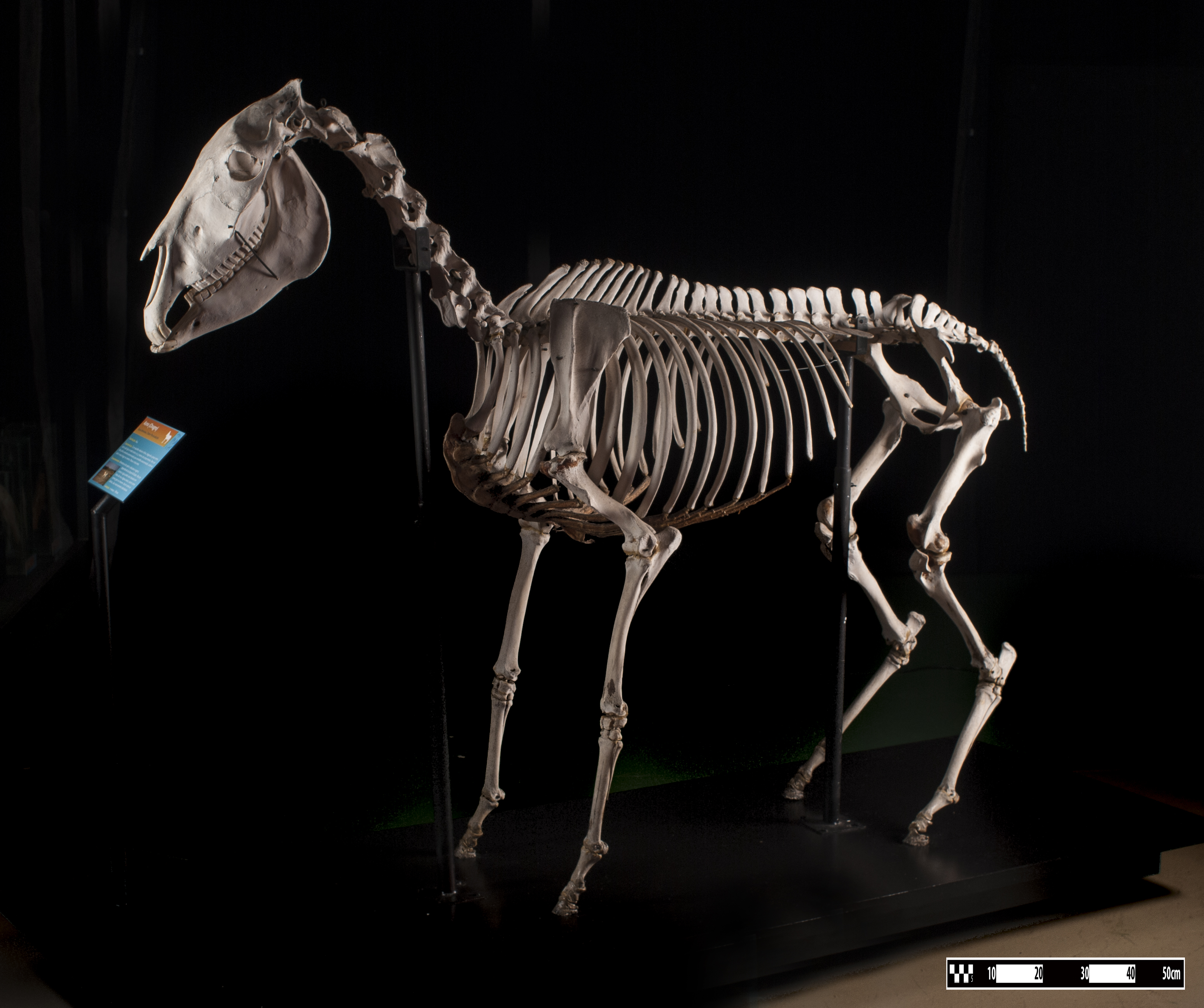
The skeleton

The onager is generally reddish-brown during the summer, becoming yellowish-brown or greyish-brown in the winter. It has a black stripe bordered in white that extends down the middle of the back. The belly, the rump, and the muzzle are white, except for the Mongolian wild ass that has a broad black dorsal stripe bordered with white. It is about 200 to 260 kg (440 to 570 lb) in size and 2.1 to 2.5 m (6 ft 11 in to 8 ft 2 in) in head-body length. Male onagers are usually larger than females.

== Evolution ==
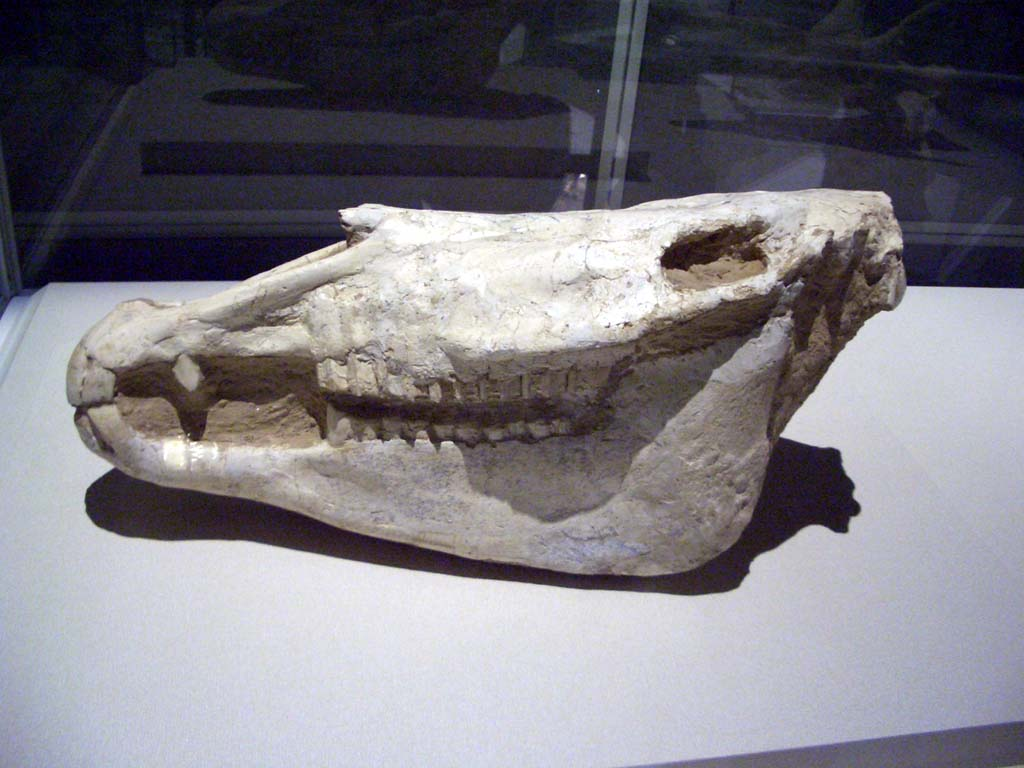
Skull of Equus eisenmannae, a giant extinct horse

The genus Equus, which includes all extant equines, is believed to have evolved from Dinohippus via the intermediate form Plesippus. One of the oldest species is Equus simplicidens, described as zebra-like with a donkey-shaped head. The oldest fossil to date is about 3.5 million years old from Idaho, USA. The genus appears to have spread quickly into the Old World, with the similarly aged Equus livenzovensis documented from western Europe and Russia.

Molecular phylogenies indicate the most recent common ancestor of all modern equids (members of the genus Equus) lived around 5.6 (3.9–7.8) million years ago (Mya). Direct paleogenomic sequencing of a 700,000-year-old middle Pleistocene horse metapodial bone from Canada implies a more recent 4.07 Mya for the most recent common ancestor within the range of 4.0 to 4.5 Mya. The oldest divergencies are the Asian hemiones (subgenus E. (Asinus), including the kulan, onager, and kiang), followed by the African zebras (subgenera E. (Dolichohippus), and E. (Hippotigris)). All other modern forms including the domesticated horse (and many fossil Pliocene and Pleistocene forms) belong to the subgenus E. (Equus) which diverged about 4.8 (3.2–6.5) Mya.

== Distribution and habitat ==
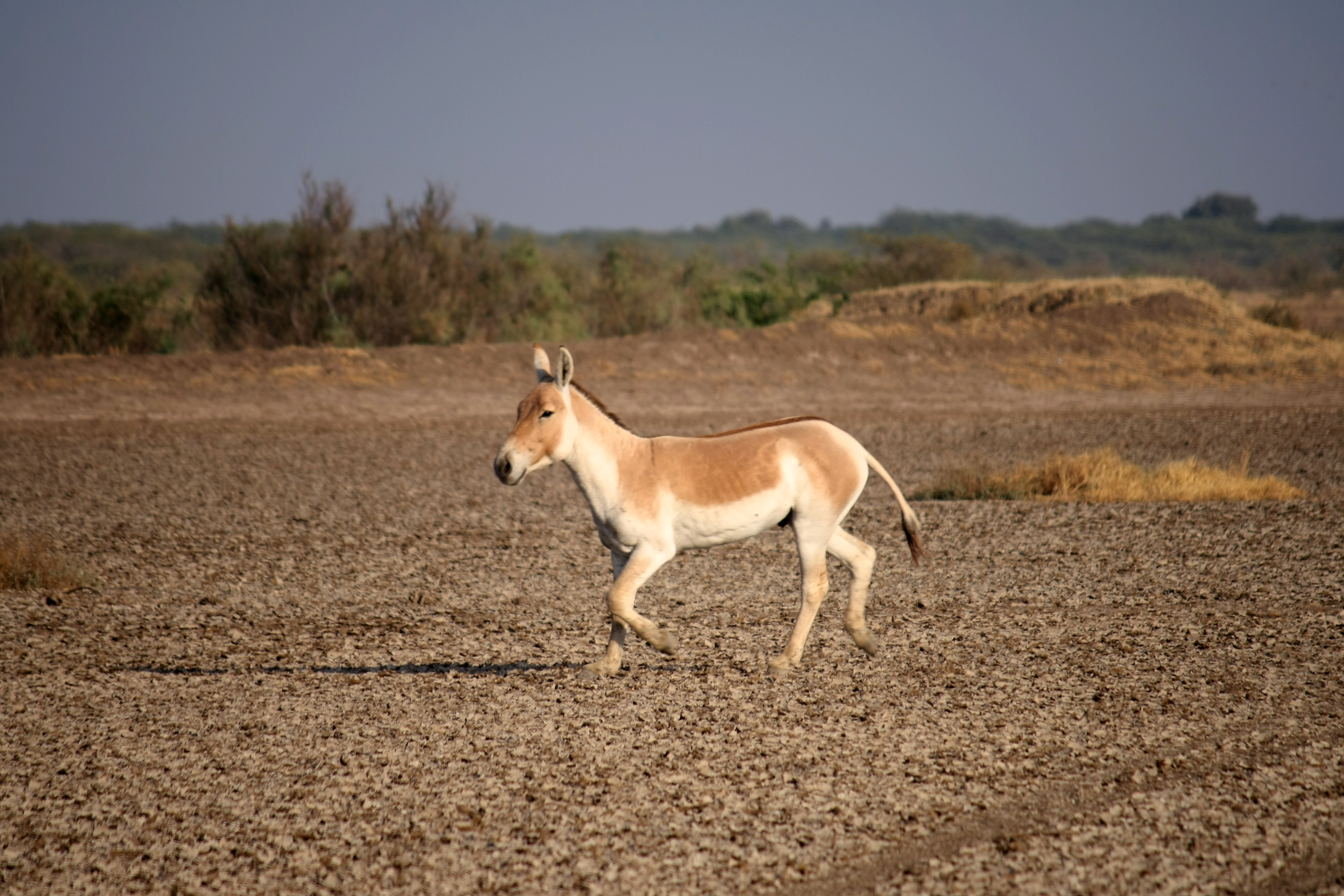
An Indian wild ass in Little Rann of Kutch, Gujarat

The onagers' favoured habitats consist of desert plains, semideserts, oases, arid grasslands, savannahs, shrublands, steppes, mountainous steppes, and mountain ranges. The Turkmenian kulan and Mongolian wild asses are known to live in hot and colder deserts. The IUCN Red List assessors estimated in 2025 that about 28,000 mature individuals remain in the wild.

During the late Pleistocene era around 40,000 years ago, the Asiatic wild ass ranged widely across Europe and in southwestern to northeastern Asia. It is also known from Middle Pleistocene fossils from the Nefud Desert of Saudi Arabia. The onager is regionally extinct in Israel, Saudi Arabia, Iraq, Jordan, Syria, and southern regions of Siberia.

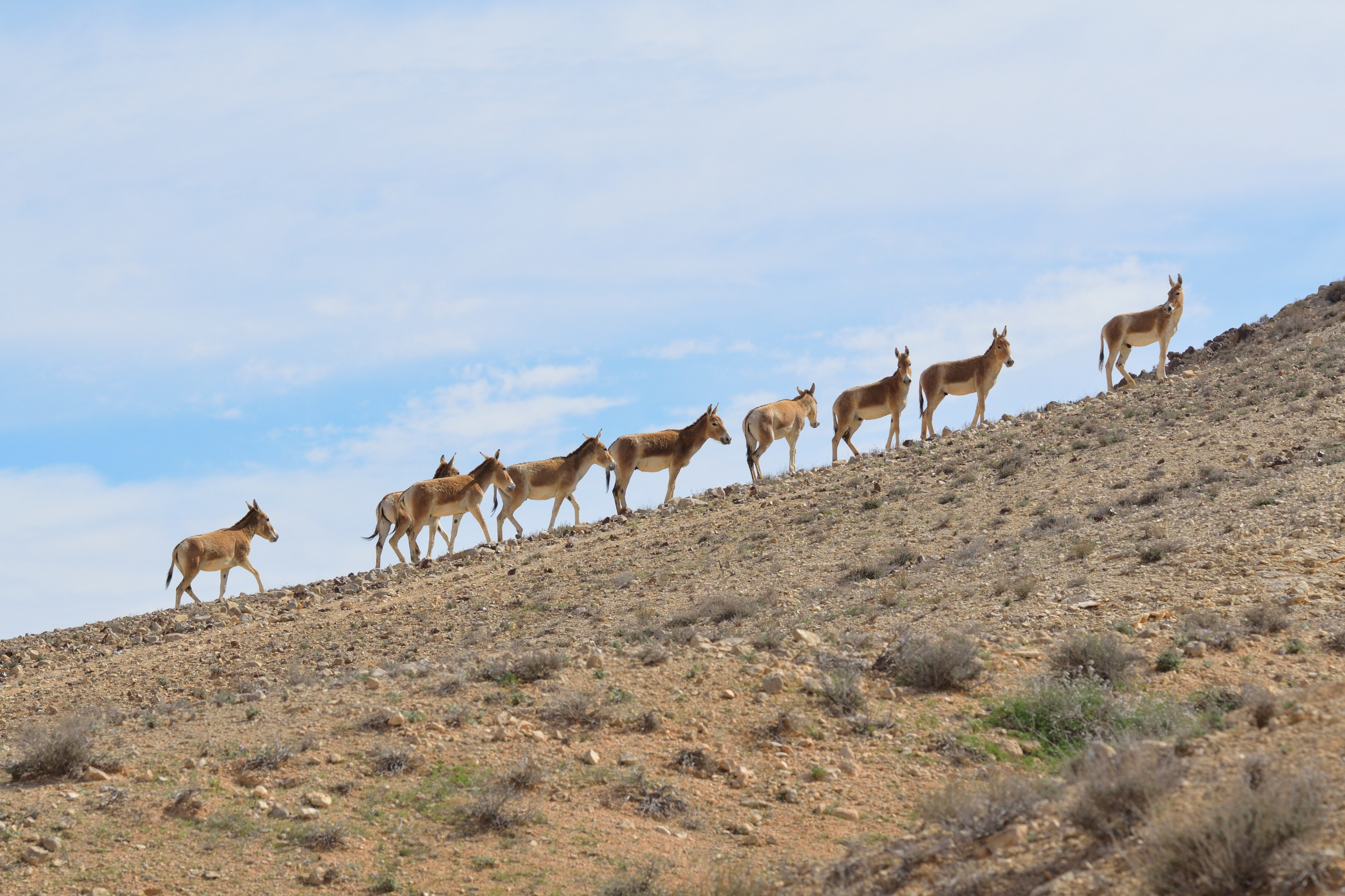
Onagers at Wadi Lotz, Negev Mountains, Israel

The Mongolian wild ass lives in deserts, mountains, and grasslands of Mongolia and Inner Mongolian region of northern China. A few live in northern Xinjiang region of northwestern China, most of which live mainly in Kalamaili Nature Reserve. It is the most common subspecies, but its populations have drastically decreased to a few thousand due to years of poaching and habitat loss in East Asia. The Gobi Desert is the onager's main stronghold. It is regionally extinct in eastern Kazakhstan, southern Siberia, and the Manchurian region of China.

The Indian wild ass was once found throughout the arid parts and desert steppes of northwest India and Pakistan; about 4,500 remain, found in a few very hot wildlife sanctuaries in Gujarat. The Persian onager is found in two subpopulations in southern and northern Iran. The larger population is found at Khar Turan National Park. However, it is extinct in Afghanistan. The Turkmenian kulan used to be widespread in central to north Asia; it is now found in Turkmenistan, and has been reintroduced in southern Kazakhstan and Uzbekistan.

== Biology and behaviour ==
Asiatic wild asses are mostly active at dawn and dusk, even during the intense heat.

=== Social structure ===
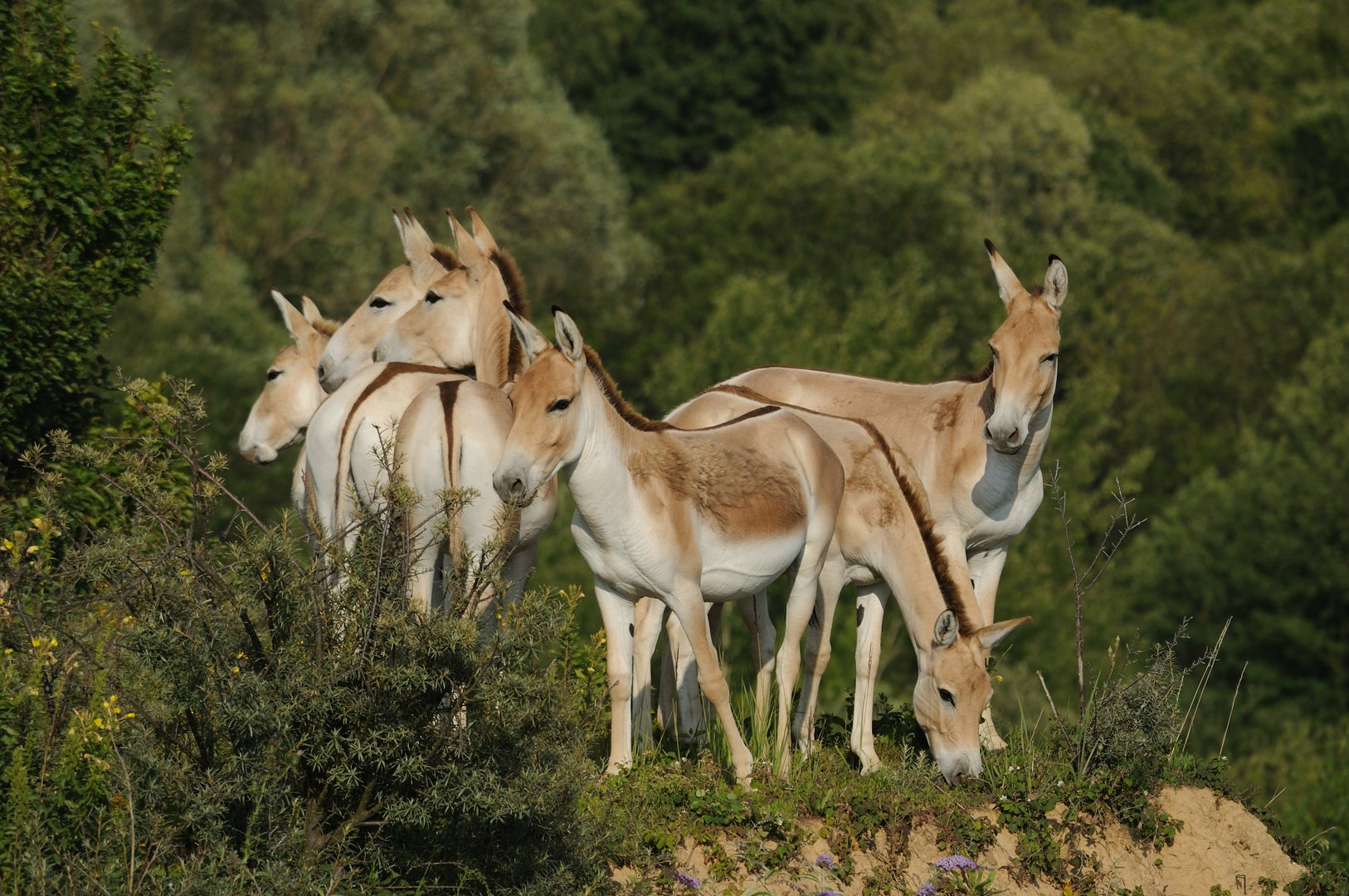
A group of onagers

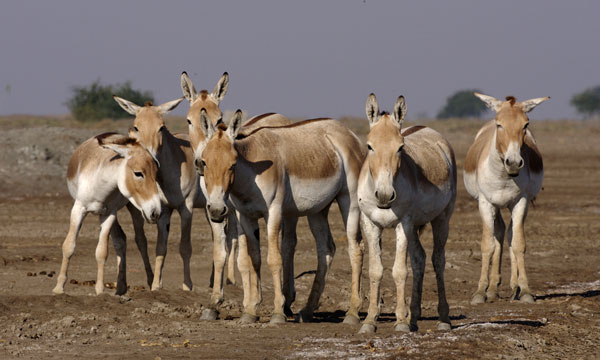
A group of khurs

Like most equids, onagers are social animals. Stallions are either solitary or live in groups of two or three. The males have been observed holding harems of females, but in other studies, the dominant stallions defend territories that attract females. Differences in behaviour and social structure likely are the result of changes in climate, vegetation cover, predation, and hunting.

The social behaviour of the Asian wild ass can vary widely, depending on different habitats and ranges, and on threats by predators including humans. In Mongolia and Central Asia (E. h. hemionus and E. h. kulan), an onager stallion can adopt harem-type social groups, with several mares and foals in large home areas in the southwest, or in territory-based social groups in the south and southeast. Also, annual large hikes occur, covering 4.5 km^{2} (1.7 sq mi) to 40 km^{2} (15 sq mi), where hiking in summer is more limited than in the winter. Onagers also occasionally form large group associations of 450 to 1,200 individuals, but this usually only occurs in places with food or water sources. As these larger groups dissolve again within a day, no overarching hierarchy apart from the ranking of the individual herds seems to exist. Young male onagers also frequently form "bachelor groups" during the winter.

Southern populations of onagers in the Middle East and South Asia tend to have a purely territorial life, where areas partly overlap. Dominant stallions have home ranges of 9 km^{2} (3.5 sq mi), but they can also be significantly larger. These territories include food and rest stops and permanent or periodic water sources. Mares with foals sometimes find themselves in small groups, in areas up to 20 km^{2} (7.7 sq mi), which overlap with those of the other groups and dominant stallions. Such features are also seen among Grévy's zebras (E. grevyi) and the African wild asses.

=== Reproduction ===
The Asian wild ass is sexually mature at two years old, and the first mating usually takes place at three to four years old.

Breeding is seasonal, and the gestation period of onagers is 11 months; the birth lasts a little more than 10 minutes. Mating and births occur from April to September, with an accumulation from June to July. The mating season in India is in the rainy season. The foal can stand and starts to nurse within 15 to 20 minutes. Females with young tend to form groups of up to five females. During rearing, a foal and dam remain close, but other animals and her own older offspring are displaced by the dam. Occasionally, stallions in territorial wild populations expel the young to mate with the mare again. Wild Asian wild asses reach an age of 14 years, but in captivity, they can live up to 26 years.

=== Diet ===
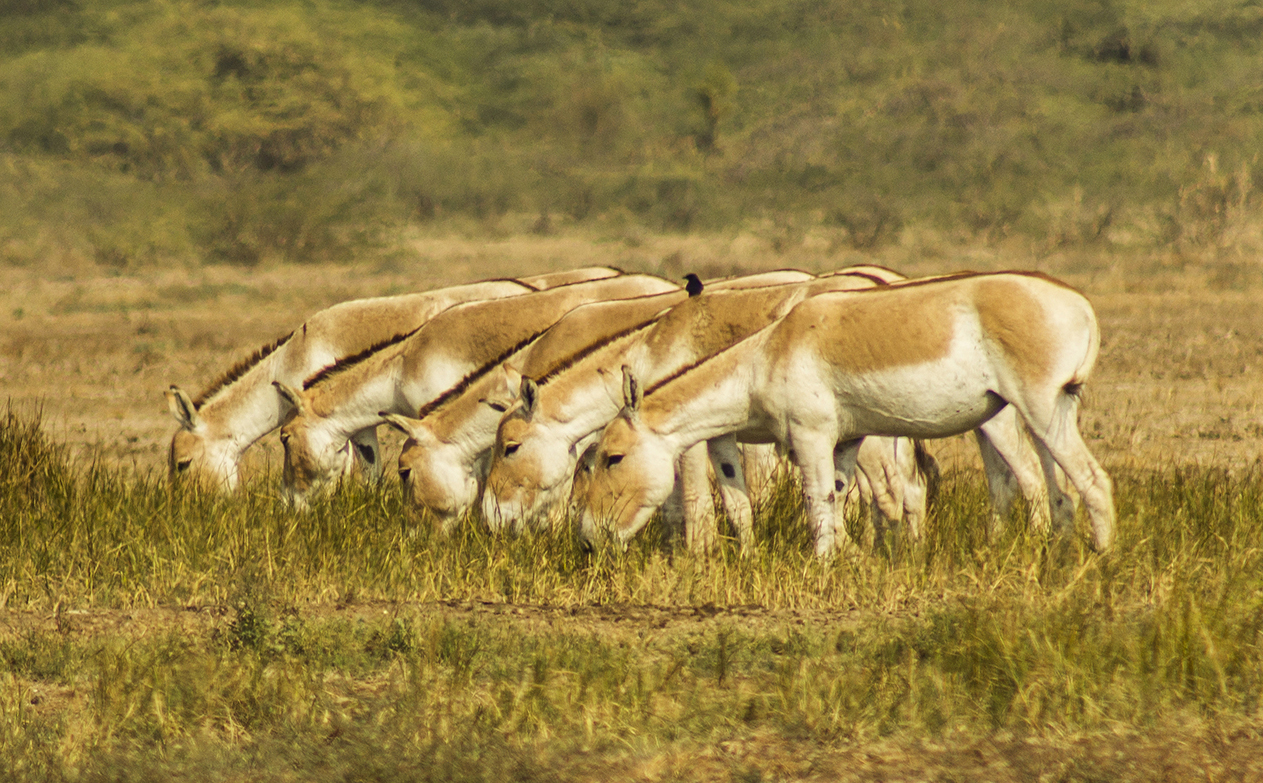
Indian wild ass herd feeding on grass

The onager is a herbivore and eats grasses, herbs, leaves, fruits, and saline vegetation when available. In dry habitats, it browses on shrubs and trees, but also feeds on seed pods such as Prosopis and breaks up woody vegetation with its hooves to get at more succulent herbs growing at the base of woody plants. The succulent plants of the Zygophyllaceae form an important component of its diet in Mongolia during spring and summer. When natural water sources are unavailable, the onager digs holes in dry riverbeds to reach subsurface water.

=== Predation ===
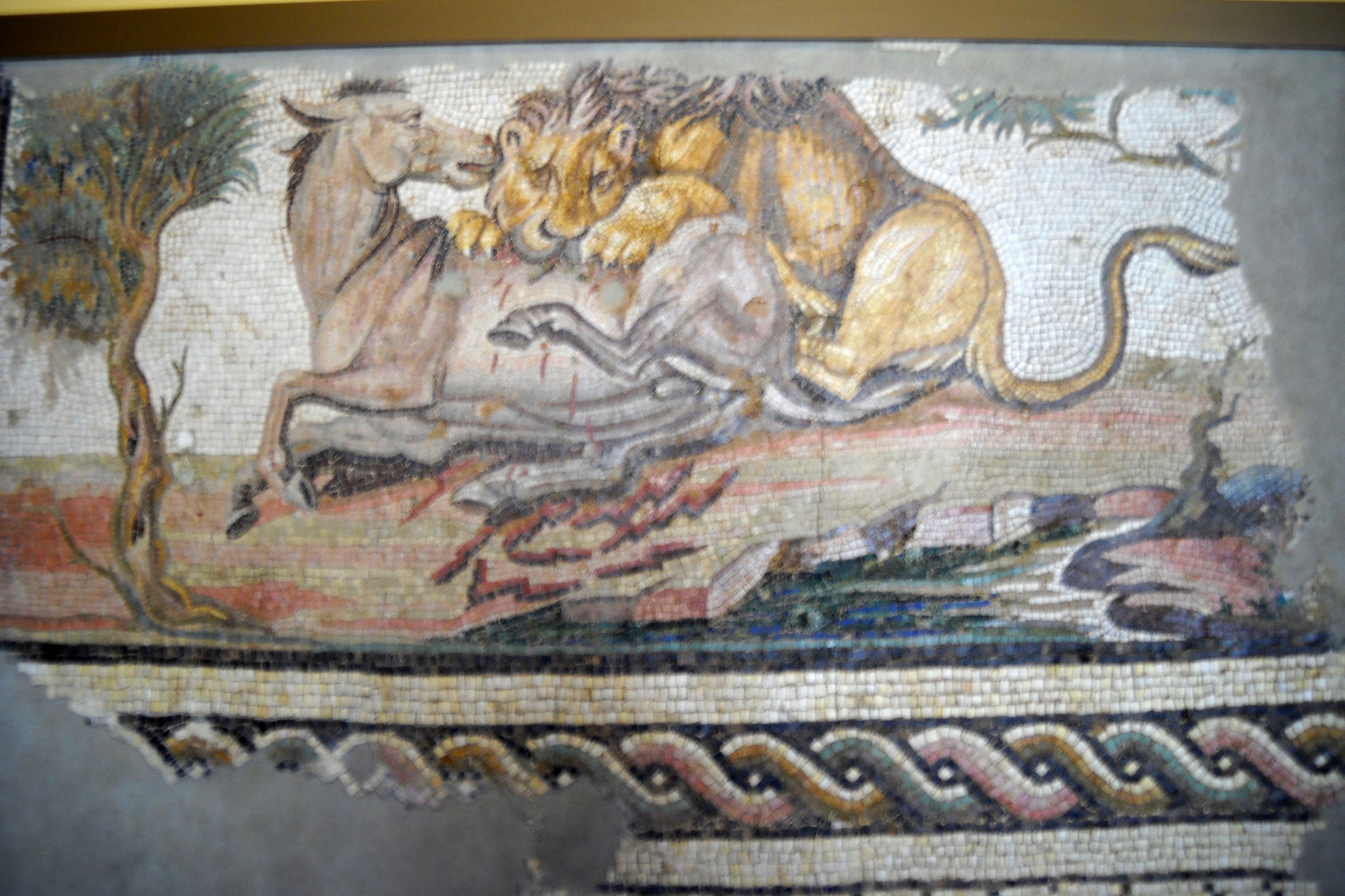
An Asiatic lion attacking an onager (Roman, c. AD 150)

The onager is preyed upon by predators such as Persian leopards and striped hyenas. A few cases of onager deaths due to predation by leopards have been recorded in Iran.

== Threats ==
The greatest threat facing the onager is poaching for meat and hides, and in some areas for use in traditional medicine. The extreme isolation of many subpopulations also threatens the species, as genetic problems can result from inbreeding. Overgrazing by livestock reduces food availability, and herders also reduce the availability of water at springs. The cutting down of nutritious shrubs and bushes exacerbates the problem. Furthermore, a series of drought years could have devastating effects on this beleaguered species.

Habitat loss and fragmentation are also major threats to the onager, a particular concern in Mongolia as a result of the increasingly dense network of roads, railway lines, and fences required to support mining activities.

The Asiatic wild ass is also vulnerable to diseases. A disease known as the African horse sickness caused a major decline to the Indian wild ass population in the 1960s. However, the subspecies is no longer under threat to such disease and is continuously increasing in number.

== Conservation ==
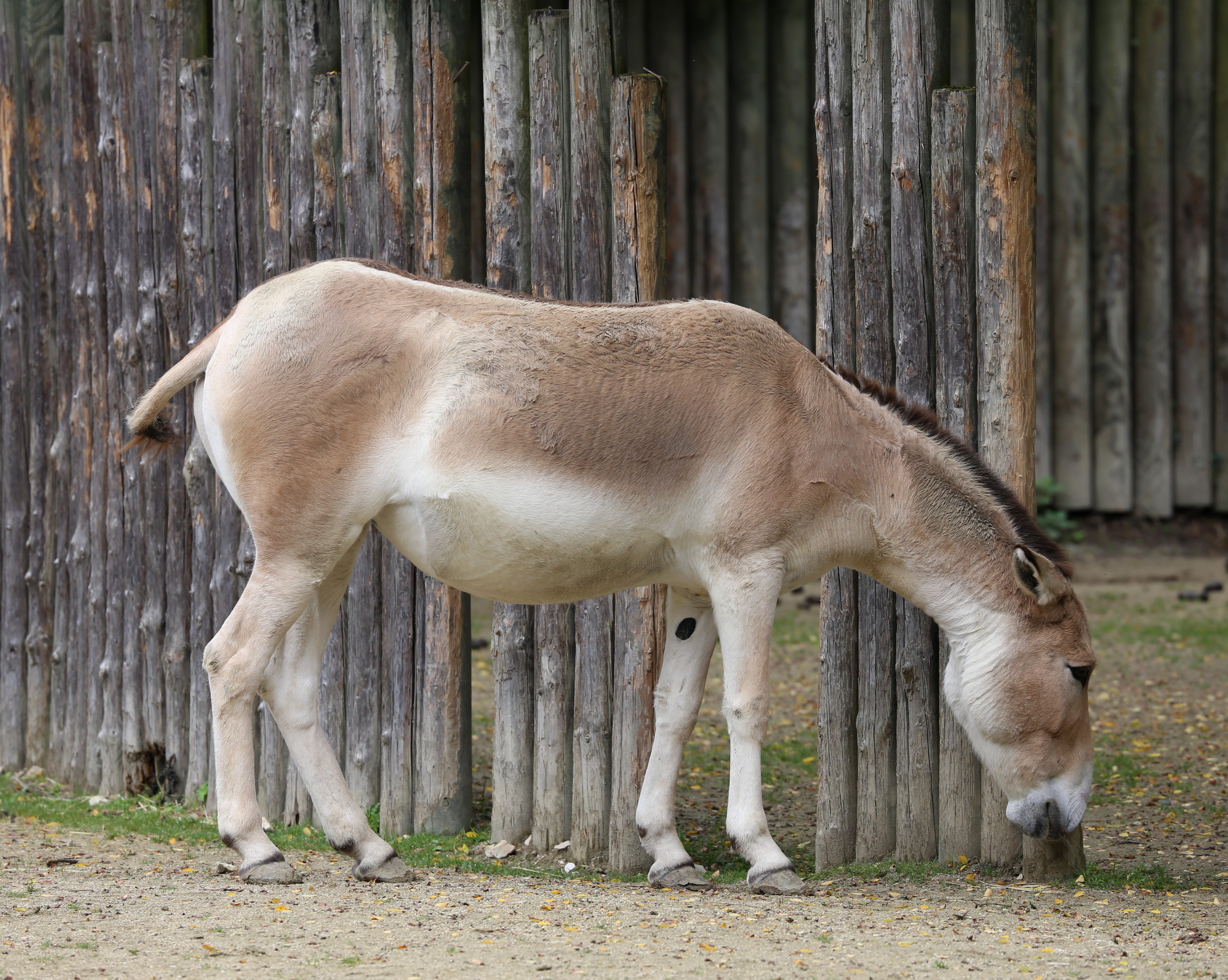
A Persian onager in Augsburg Zoo

Various breeding programs have been started for the onager subspecies in captivity and in the wild, which increases their numbers to save the endangered species. The species is legally protected in many of the countries in which it occurs. The priority for future conservation measures is to ensure the protection of this species in particularly vulnerable parts of its range, to encourage the involvement of local people in the conservation of the onager, and to conduct further research into the behaviour, ecology, and taxonomy of the species.

Two onager subspecies, the Persian onager and the Turkmenian kulan are being reintroduced to their former ranges, including in other regions the Syrian wild ass used to occur in the Middle East. The two subspecies have been reintroduced to the wild of Israel since 1982, and had been breeding hybrids there, whilst the Persian onager alone has been reintroduced to Jordan and the deserts of Saudi Arabia.

== In culture ==
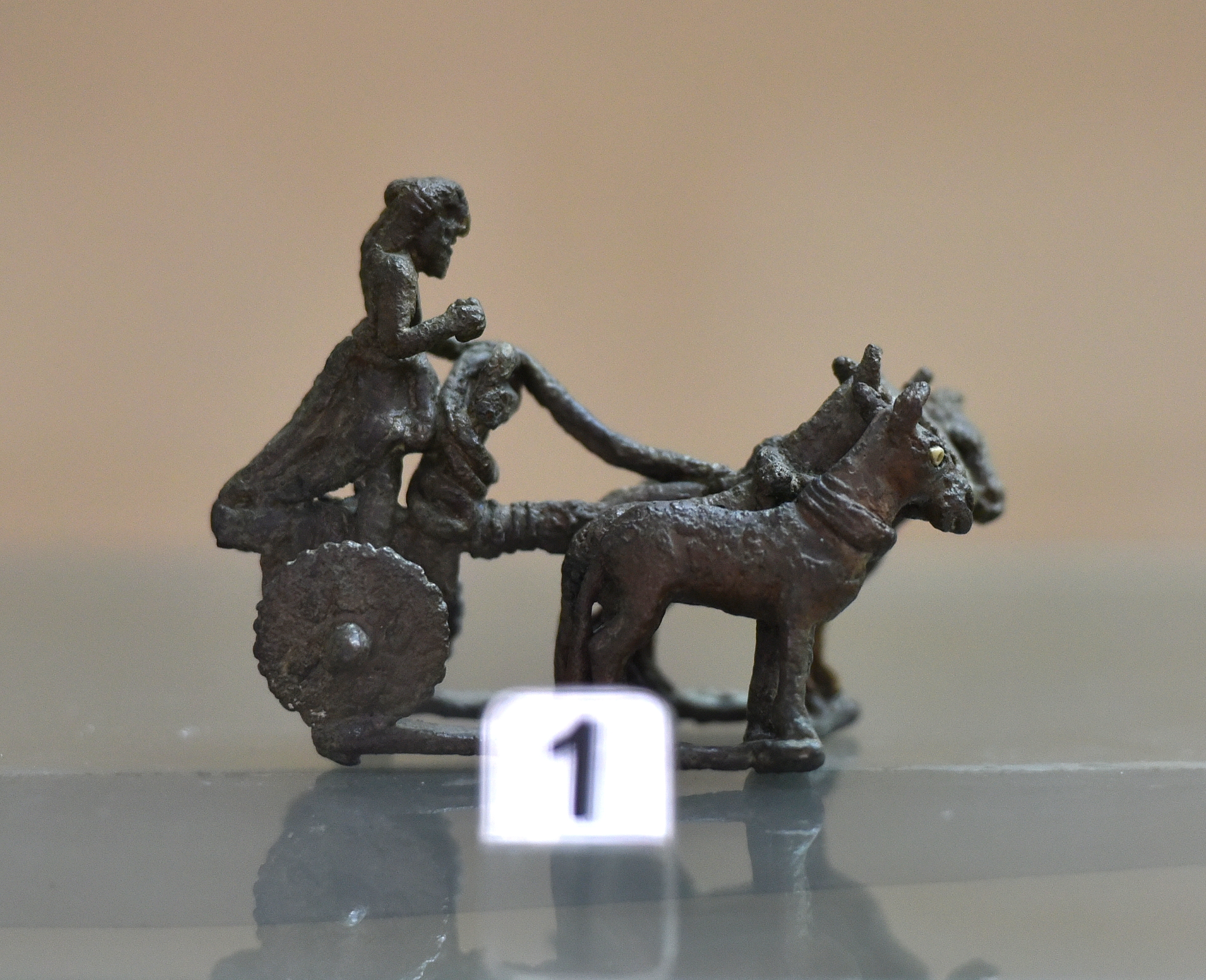
Quadriga of a chariot and a charioteer with four onagers from Tell Agrab, early Dynastic period, 2600–2370 BCE, displayed in Iraq Museum

Onagers are notoriously difficult to tame. Equids were used in ancient Sumer to pull wagons c. 2600 BC, and then chariots on the Standard of Ur, c. 2550 BC. It has been suggested that these were donkeys rather than onagers on the basis of a "shoulder stripe". However, close examination of the equids, sheep and cattle on both sides of the piece indicate that what appears to be a stripe may well be a harness, a trapping, or a joint in the inlay.
