= Roland Gúr =

Hungarian politician and lawyer

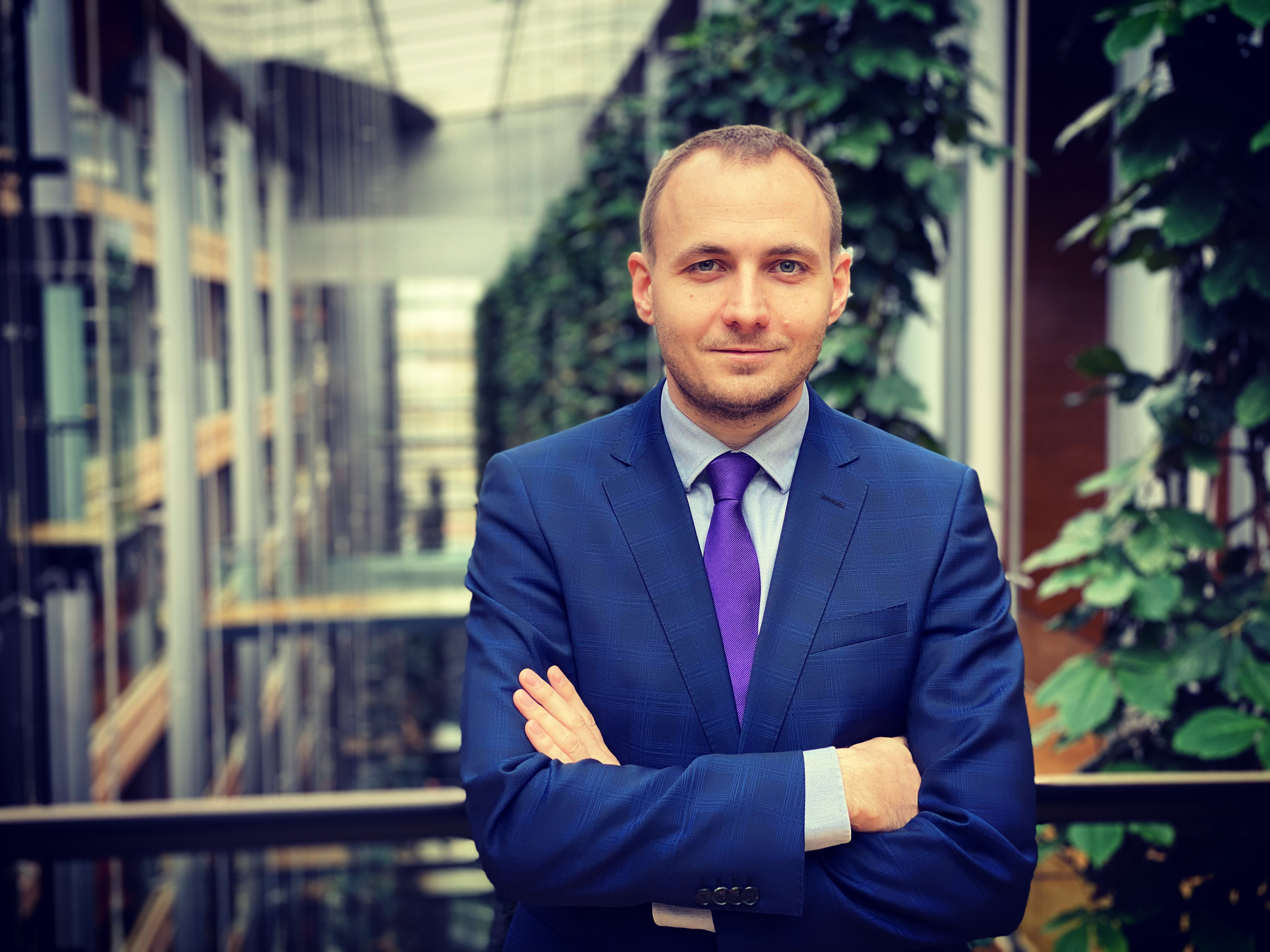

IUSY Control Commission President
- Incumbent
- Assumed office 27 February 2016
- Preceded by: Stephan Köker (Germany)

Personal details
- Born: 11 August 1983 (age 42) Miskolc, Hungary
- Party: MSZP
- Other political affiliations: Party of European Socialists (PES) EU
- Profession: lawyer - international and EU law, politician

Roland Gúr (born 11 August 1983) is a Hungarian politician and lawyer, specialised on international and EU law. Currently, he serves as President of the Control Commission of the biggest political youth organisation of the world (IUSY). Policy Advisor on Internal market and Consumer protection to MEP Marc Angel, Head of the Luxembourgish S&D Delegation in the European Parliament and also the President of the Hungarian Socialist Party's Consumer Protection Section. He was a candidate on the third rank of his party's list during the 2014 European Parliament election.

== Education ==
Gúr attended the Faculty of Law of the University of Miskolc, where he studied law and state sciences. He earned a degree of summa cum laude in 2007. Thereafter he studied European law studies in the European University Centre (CEU), an institute of the Nancy 2 University, where earned his master's degree in 2009.

In 2013, he earned absolutorium for PhD at the Deák Ferenc Doctoral School of Law of the University of Miskolc. He was laureate of the Pro Scintia academic award in 2007. Beside his native language Hungarian, Gúr fluently speaks English and French. He also speaks some Spanish.

== Work experience ==
Between 2007 and 2010, he was administrator of the Ministry of Rural Development of Hungary at the EU Coordination and International Affairs Department and later at the Secretariat of the EU Affairs State Secretary. In 2010, he worked as an agricultural attaché at the Embassy of Hungary in Paris. Between January 2011 and October 2013, he was coordinator of the Hungarian Socialist Party's delegation to the European Parliament. Between 2014 and 2019, he was Head of office to Tibor Szanyi, Member of the European Parliament. As of 2020, he is the Internal market and Consumer protection policy advisor to MEP Marc Angel, Head of the Luxembourgish S&D Delegation in the European Parliament.

As from January 2014, he serves as international secretary of Societas, which is the joint youth movement of the Hungarian Socialist Party. At the same year he has been elected as Bureau member of the Young European Socialists. On 27 February 2016, he has been elected as President of the Control Commission of the International Union of Socialist Youth (IUSY) with almost two-thirds majority. In 2018, he has been reelected with 89 votes against 47 to another candidate.

=== Social activity ===
Between 2002 and 2006, he was a member and then vice-chair of the election committee of the 2nd district of Budapest. He is a member of the Society of Pro Scientia Gold Medal Winners. He is author of more than 35 publications and articles.

== Personal life ==
His father Nándor Gúr was a member of the Hungarian National Assembly between 2002 and 2018.
