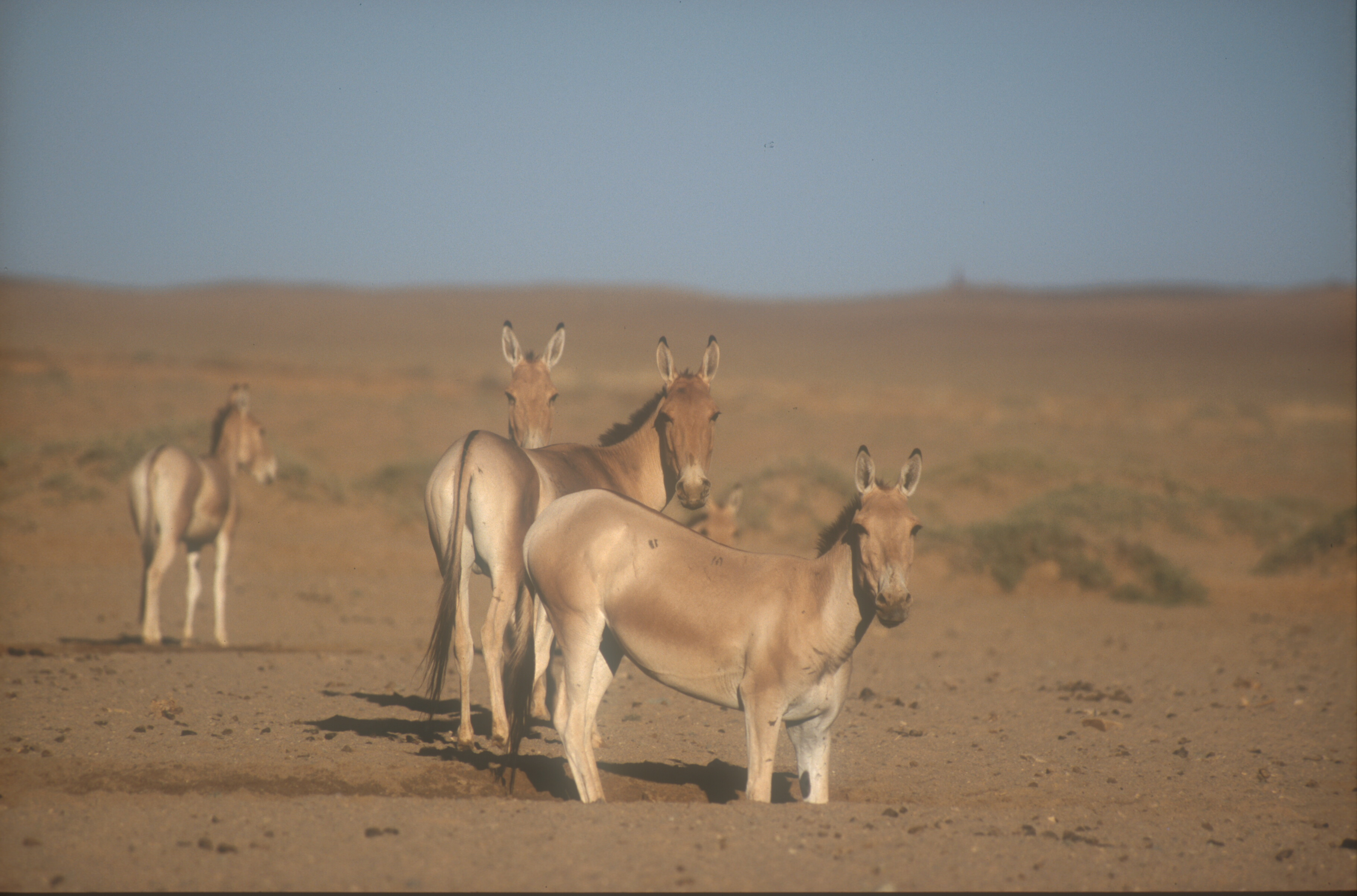
- Mongolian wild asses in the Gobi Desert, Mongolia.

Conservation status
- Near Threatened (IUCN 3.1)
- CITES Appendix I

Scientific classification
- Kingdom: Animalia
- Phylum: Chordata
- Class: Mammalia
- Order: Perissodactyla
- Family: Equidae
- Genus: Equus
- Species: E. hemionus
- Subspecies: E. h. hemionus

Trinomial name
- Equus hemionus hemionus Pallas, 1775

Synonyms
- Equus (Asinus) hemionus bedfordi Matschie 1911; Equus (Asinus) hemionus findschi Matschie 1911; Equus (Asinus) hemionus luteus Matschie 1911

= Mongolian wild ass =

Subspecies of onager

The Mongolian wild ass (Equus hemionus hemionus), also known as Mongolian khulan, is the nominate subspecies of the onager. It is found in southern Mongolia and northern China. It was previously found in eastern Kazakhstan and southern Siberia before being extirpated there through hunting. As of 2015, the Mongolian wild ass is listed as Near Threatened by the IUCN. In 2015, population estimates were approximately 42,000 individuals in Mongolia and around 5,000 individuals in northern China.

== Taxonomy and etymology ==
The Mongolian wild ass is synonymous with the Gobi khulan (Equus hemionus luteus), also called the chigetai, dziggetai or simply khulan, Mongolian: Хулан.

The term khulan is cognate with the Turkmenian kulan.

== Habitat and population ==
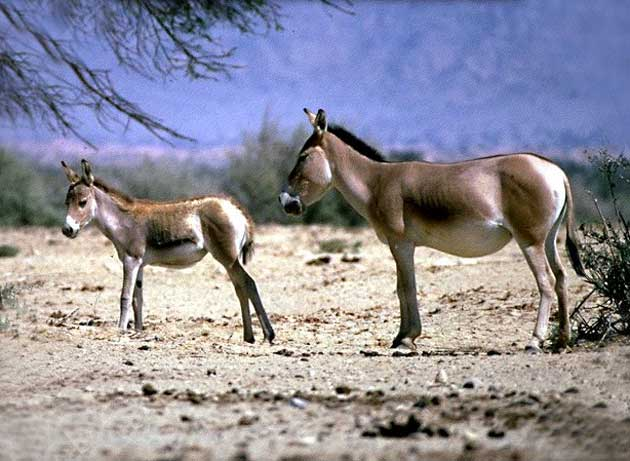
Two Mongolian wild asses at Gobi Desert, Mongolia.

The Mongolian wild ass has become primarily confined to the desert-steppe, semi-desert and deserts habitats of Gobi Desert.

The Mongolian wild ass is the most widespread subspecies, although despite that, the subspecies lost about 50% of its former distribution range in Mongolia in the past 70 years. The former range of the Asiatic wild ass in East Asia between the seventeenth and the middle of the nineteenth century encompassed the greater part of Mongolia, areas of Siberia and Manchuria, the western part of Inner Mongolia and the northern part of Xinjiang. Its distribution range then dramatically reduced during the 1990s. A 1994–1997 survey estimated its population size at 33,000 to 63,000 individuals over a continuous distribution range encompassing all of southern Mongolia. In 2003, a new survey found approximately 20,000 individuals over an area of 177,563 square kilometres (68,557 sq mi) in southern Mongolia. The species had decreased to 14,000 individuals in 2009. The population estimates of the Mongolian population should be treated with caution due to a lack of proven survey protocols.

== Biology and behavior ==
The Mongolian wild ass are herbivorous mammals. They feed on grasses, herbs and vegetation. They also feed on shrubs and trees in drier habitats. During spring and summer in Mongolia, the succulent plants of the family Zygophyllaceae form an important component of the diet of the Mongolian wild ass.

Mongolian khulans are known to dig holes at dry river beds and water sources to access subsurface water to drink in response of the lack of water during hot summers in the Gobi Desert. Watering holes dug by khulans are also used by other species (wild and domestic) as well as by humans to access to water.

== Threats ==
The Mongolian wild ass population is declining due to poaching and competition from grazing livestock. The conservation status of the species is evaluated as endangered.

The Mongolian khulan are threatened by apex predators, such as gray wolves, dholes and formerly by tigers, that became extinct within the regions.

Poaching for meat appears to be an increasing problem in Mongolia. For some parts of the local population, wild ass and other wildlife meat seems to provide a substitute or even a cheap alternative to meat from domestic animals. In 2005, a national survey based on questionnaires, suggested that as many as 4,500 wild asses, about 20% of the whole population, may be poached each year. Moreover, political changes in the early 1990s allowed urban populations to return to nomadic land use, resulting in a sharp increase in human and livestock numbers in many rural areas.

Political and societal changes have disrupted traditional land use patterns, weakened law enforcement and also changed attitudes towards the use of natural resources, e.g., making wildlife an "open access" resource. It is expected that the re-migration of people and their livestock will result in increased wildlife–human interactions and may well threaten the survival of rare wildlife species in the Gobi Desert.

== Conservation actions ==
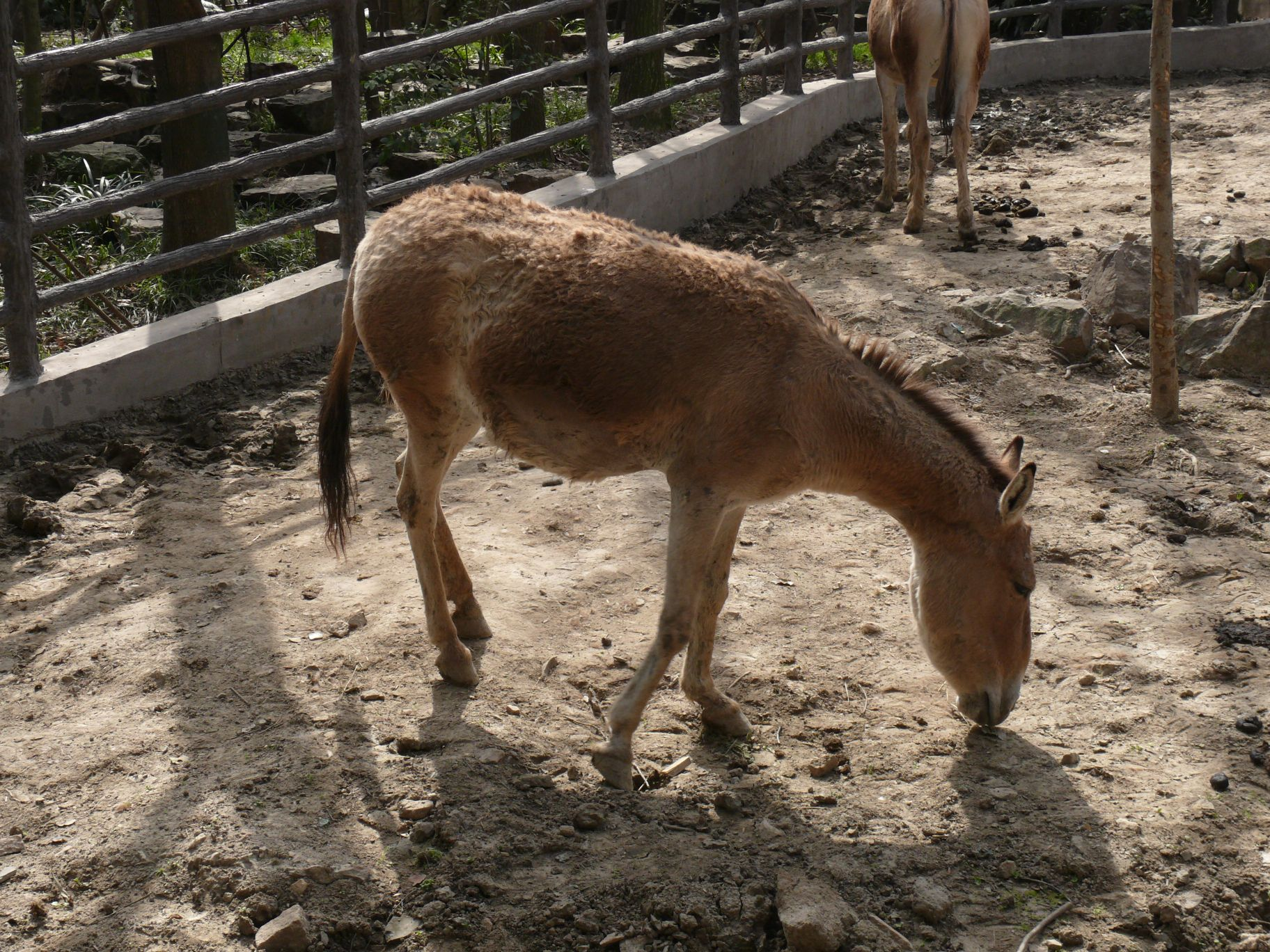
A Mongolian wild ass at Shanghai Zoo, China.

Since 1953, the Mongolian wild ass has been fully protected in Mongolia. The subspecies is also listed at appendix I of CITES (the Convention on the International Trade in Endangered Species of Wild Flora and Fauna) and was added to appendix II of the Convention of Migratory Species in 2002. However, due to human population growth in conjunction with severe winters in the past years, the number of conflicts between herders and Mongolian wild asses appear on the increase. Information on the basic biology of the subspecies and how it differs from others is lacking, which hampers conservation efforts.

== In captivity ==
The Mongolian wild asses are rare in captivity in the world, though the captive animals are mostly found in China, such as in Beijing Zoo, Shanghai Zoo and Kunming Zoo in Yunnan.

== Related subspecies ==
- Turkmenian kulan, Equus hemionus kulan
- Persian onager (gur), Equus hemionus onager
- Indian wild ass (khur), Equus hemionus khur
- Syrian wild ass or hemippe, Equus hemionus hemippus (extinct)

== See also ==
- Kiang or, Tibetan wild ass
- Przewalski's horse or, Mongolian wild horse
- Mongolian horse
- Takhi
- Horses in East Asian warfare
- Yakutian horse
