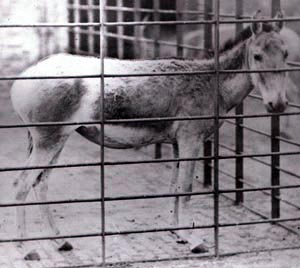
- A Syrian wild ass in London Zoo, 1872

Conservation status
- Extinct (1927) (IUCN 3.1)

Scientific classification
- Kingdom: Animalia
- Phylum: Chordata
- Class: Mammalia
- Order: Perissodactyla
- Family: Equidae
- Genus: Equus
- Species: E. hemionus
- Subspecies: †E. h. hemippus

Trinomial name
- †Equus hemionus hemippus I. Geoffroy, 1855

Synonyms
- Equus hemionus syriacus (Milne-Edwards, 1869)

= Syrian wild ass =

Extinct subspecies of onager

The Syrian wild ass (Equus hemionus hemippus), less commonly known as a hemippe, an achdari, or a Mesopotamian or Syrian onager, is an extinct subspecies of onager native to the Arabian Peninsula and surrounding areas. It ranged across present-day Iraq, Palestine, Israel, Iran, Jordan, Saudi Arabia, Syria, and Turkey.

It is believed this may be the "wild ass" that Ishmael was prophesied to be in Genesis in the Old Testament. References to this wild ass also appear in the Old Testament books of Job, Psalms, Jeremiah, and the Deuterocanonical Book of Sirach.

== Description ==
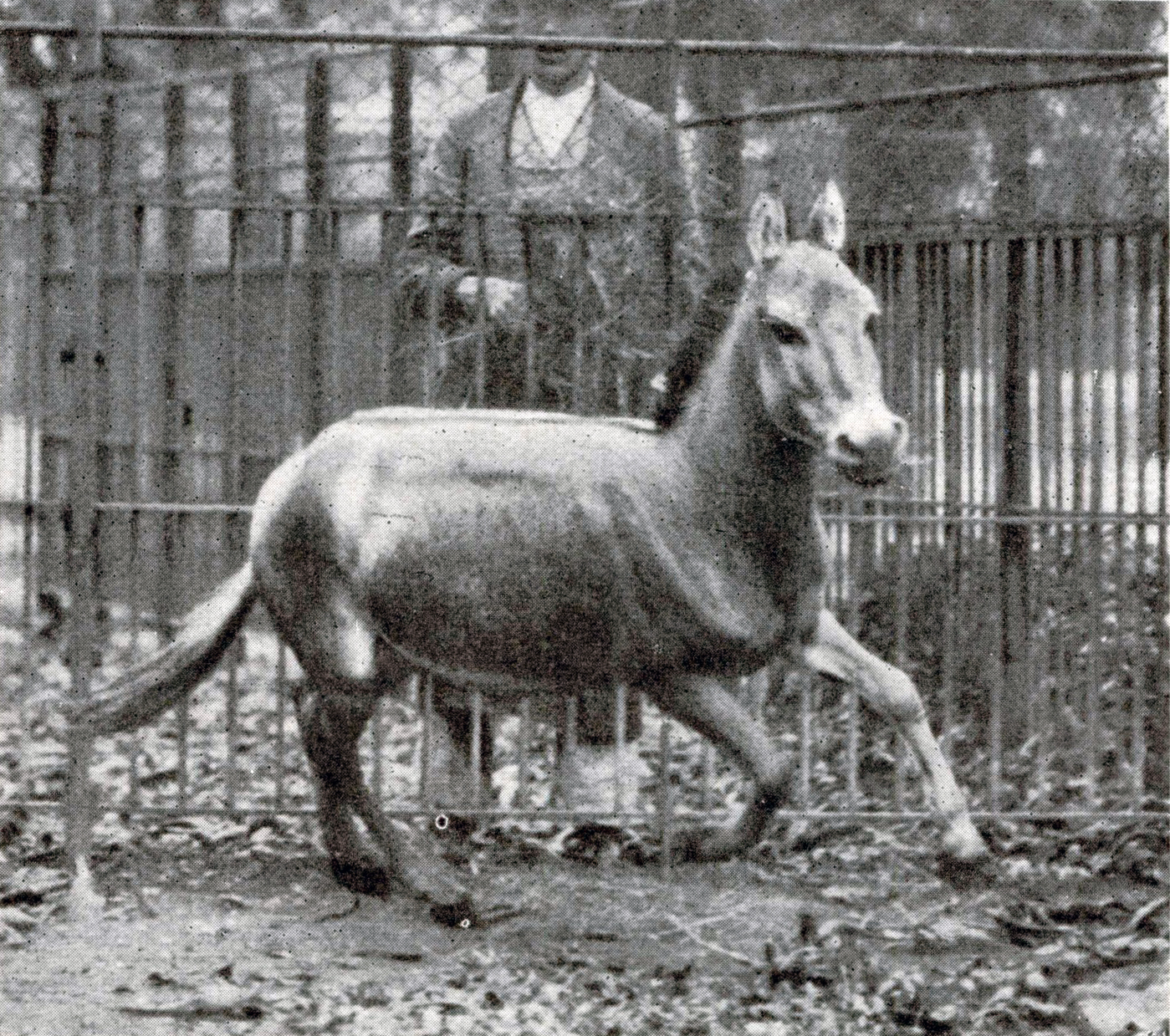
Galloping specimen in Tiergarten Schönbrunn, 1915

The Syrian wild ass, one metre high at its shoulder, was the smallest equine, and it could not be domesticated. Its coloring changed with the seasons—a tawny olive coat for the summer months, and pale sandy yellow for the winter. It was known, like other onagers, to be untameable, and was compared to a thoroughbred horse for its beauty and strength.

== Distribution and habitat ==
The Syrian wild ass lived in deserts, semi-deserts, arid grasslands, and mountain steppes. Native to West Asia, they were found in Israel, Palestine, Jordan, Turkey, Syria, Saudi Arabia, and Iraq.

== Ecology and behavior ==
=== Diet ===
The Syrian wild ass was a grazer and a browser. It fed on grass, herbs, leaves, shrubs, and tree branches.

=== Predation ===
Syrian wild asses were preyed upon by Asiatic lions, Arabian leopards, striped hyenas, Syrian brown bears, Arabian wolves, and Caspian tigers. Asiatic cheetahs and golden jackals may have also preyed on foals.

== Relationship with humans ==
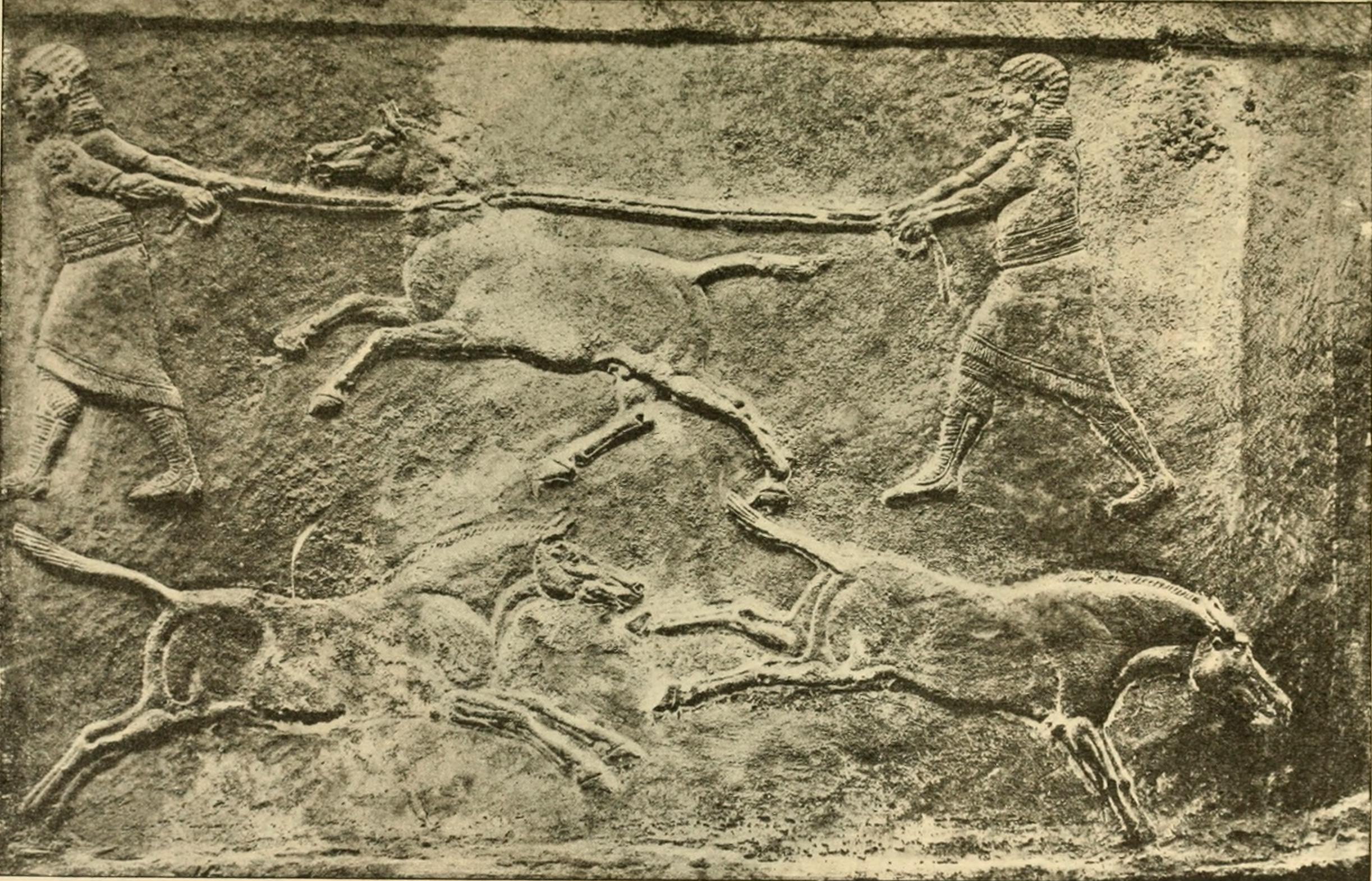
Assyrians wrangling a wild ass, seventh century BCE

The bones of a Syrian wild ass have been identified at an 11,000 year-old archaeological site at Göbekli Tepe, Turkey. Cuneiform from the third millennium BCE report the hunting of an 'equid of the desert' (anše-edin-na), valued for its meat and hide, which may have been E. h. hemippus. Although Syrian wild asses were not themselves domesticated, a significant breeding center at Tell Brak produced a hybrid of the wild ass and the donkey, called the kunga, that was a draft animal of high economic and symbolic value to the elite of Syria and Mesopotamia. They appear in cuneiform inscriptions and their bones are found in burials from the third millennium BCE. The size of these hybrids, larger than modern examples of both parent species, has led to speculation that the Syrian wild asses used historically in breeding the kunga were of larger size than the individuals observed in the remant populations of the 18th and 19th centuries.

Assyrian art from the 7th century BCE found at Nineveh includes a scene of hunters capturing Syrian wild asses with lassos.

Xenophon of Athens mentions Syrian wild asses in his Anabasis of ~370 BCE. He reports that they were the most common of animals encountered in Syria; in addition to ostriches, bustards, and gazelles. Xenophon states that horsemen would occasionally chase the asses, with the asses easily able to outrun the horses. He said that asses would only run a short distance ahead of the horses before stopping, waiting for the horses to get closer, and then running ahead yet again. He described the asses as impossible to catch without careful planning. Xenophon also related that the meat of the asses tasted like a more tender version of venison.

It is believed this may be the "wild ass" that Ishmael was prophesied to be in Genesis in the Old Testament. References to this wild ass also appear in the Old Testament books of Job, Psalms, Jeremiah, and the Deuterocanonical Book of Sirach. The Quran, the main book of Islam, in Surat Al-Muddaththir, refers to a scene of ḥumur (Arabic: حُمُر, 'asses' or 'donkeys' in plural form, Arabic: حِمَار, romanized: Ḥimār singular) fleeing from a qaswarah (lion). This was to criticize people who were averse to Muhammad's teachings, such as supporting the welfare of the less wealthy.

=== Later hybrids ===
In addition to the Bronze Age kunga, a couple of modern hybrids were produced by the London Zoo in the late 19th century. In 1878, a Syrian wild ass was crossed with an Indian wild ass (a different subspecies), and in 1883 an inter-species cross between a Syrian wild ass male and an Abyssinian wild ass female produced a foal that was colored like the sire, and described as "a fine animal" but "vicious and untamed".

=== Extinction ===
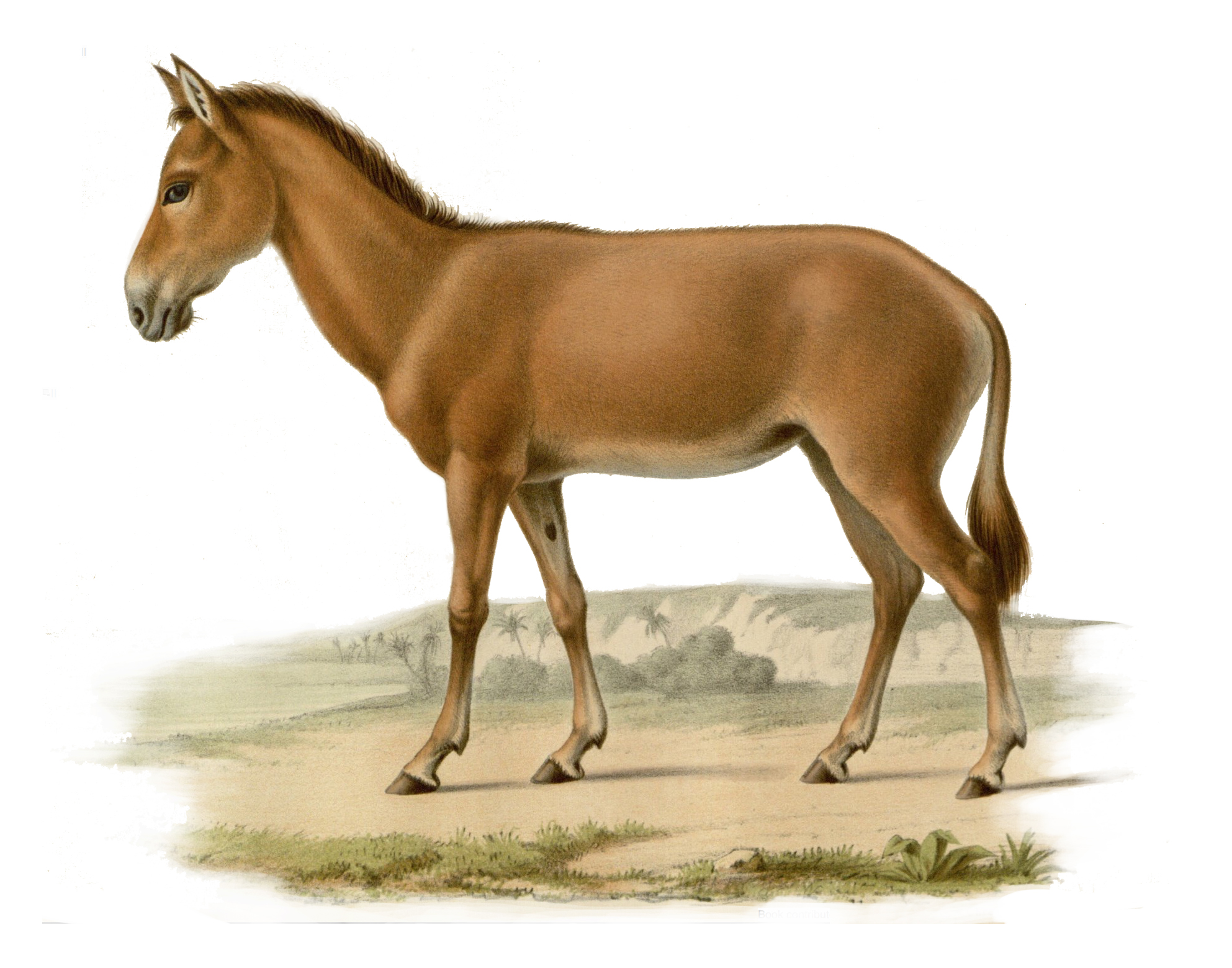
Illustration from 1869

European travelers in the Middle East during the fifteenth and sixteenth centuries reported seeing large herds. However, its numbers began to drop precipitously during the eighteenth and nineteenth centuries due to overhunting, and its existence was further imperiled by the regional upheaval of World War I. The last known wild specimen was fatally shot in 1927 at Al-Ghams near the Azraq oasis in Jordan, and the last captive specimen died the same year at the Tiergarten Schönbrunn in Vienna.

=== Replacement ===
After the extinction of the Syrian wild ass, the Persian onager from Iran was chosen as an appropriate subspecies to repopulate the Middle East as a replacement for the extinct E. h. hemippus onagers. The Persian onager was then introduced to the protected areas of Saudi Arabia and Jordan. It also was reintroduced, along with the Turkmenian kulan, to Israel, where they both reproduce wild ass hybrids in the Negev Mountains and the Yotvata Hai-Bar Nature Reserve.

== Related subspecies ==
- Mongolian wild ass (khulan), Equus hemionus hemionus
- Turkmenian kulan (kulan), Equus hemionus kulan
- Indian wild ass (khur), Equus hemionus khur
- Persian onager (gur), Equus hemionus onager
