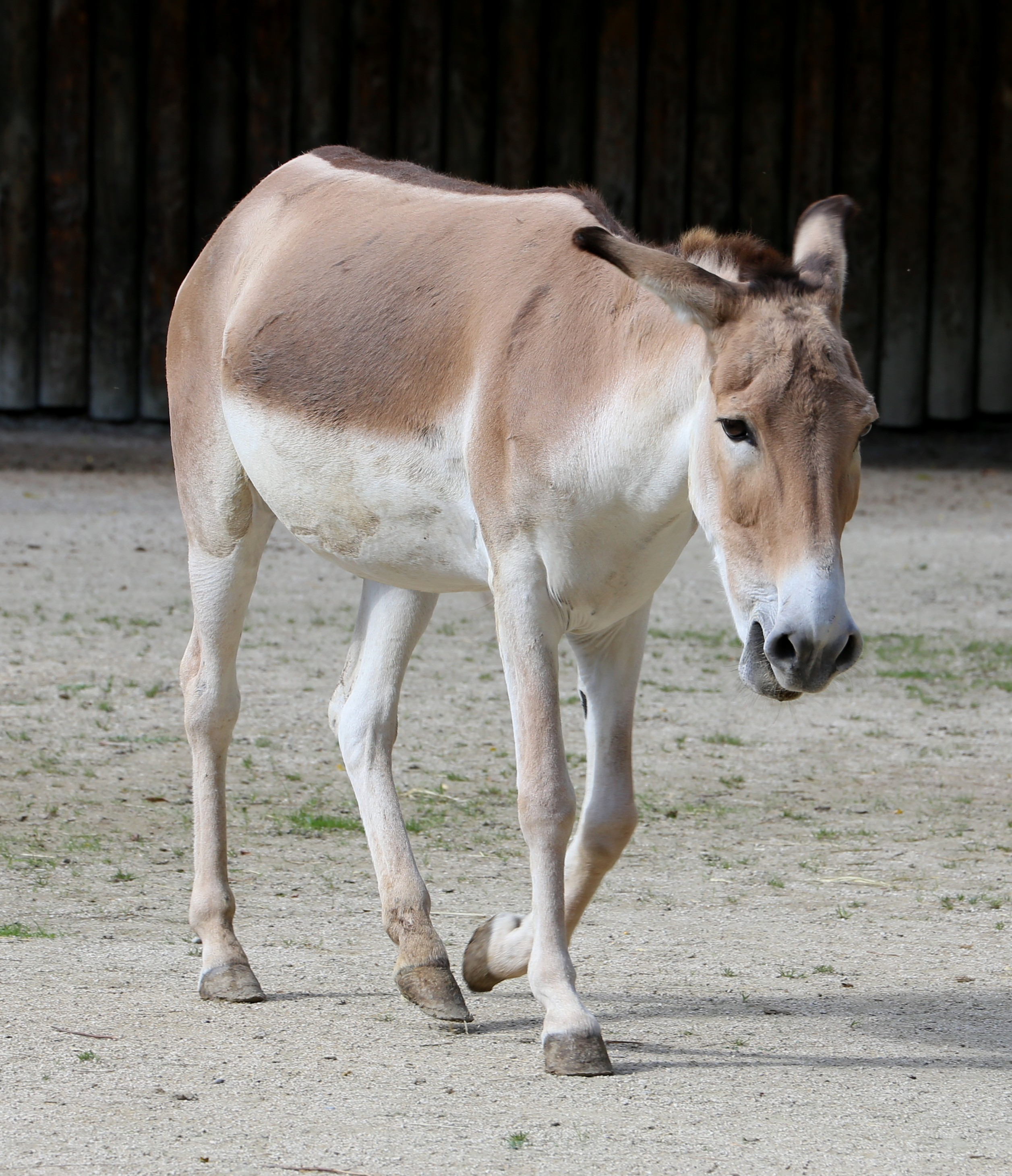
- Persian onager at Augsburg Zoo, Germany

Conservation status
- Critically Endangered (IUCN 3.1)
- CITES Appendix II

Scientific classification
- Kingdom: Animalia
- Phylum: Chordata
- Class: Mammalia
- Order: Perissodactyla
- Family: Equidae
- Genus: Equus
- Species: E. hemionus
- Subspecies: E. h. onager

Trinomial name
- Equus hemionus onager (Boddaert, 1785)

= Persian onager =

Subspecies of onager

The Persian onager (Equus hemionus onager), also called the Persian wild ass or Persian zebra, is a subspecies of onager (Asiatic wild ass) native to Iran. It is listed as Critically Endangered, with no more than 600 individuals left in the wild.

== Description ==
Persian onagers are 6.7–8.3 feet (2.0–2.5 m) long, reach 3.3–4.8 feet (1.0–1.5 m) at the shoulder, and weigh 200–260 kg (440–570 lb). Females are slightly smaller than males.

Typically the coat is a sandy red, with a brown dorsal stripe. Thin strips of white on either side of the dorsal stripe merge with the white patch on the rear. There is also white on the underside and flanks.

== Taxonomy and history ==
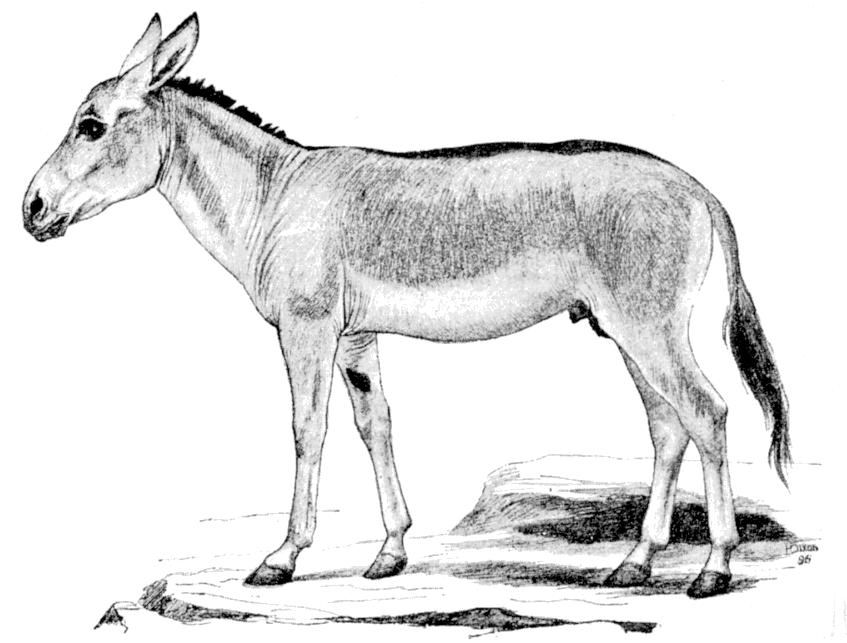
A drawing of a Persian onager

The Persian onager is also simply named gur (گور) meaning "zebra" in Persian. "Onager" is from the Greek ὄναγρος (onagros), meaning "wild ass".

Sometimes, the term "onager" is reserved specifically for this subspecies. However, as the whole species of the Asiatic wild ass is known simply as onager, it now also serves as the Persian wild ass's scientific name, as well (Equus hemionus onager). Information on the basic biology of the subspecies and how it differs from others is lacking, which hampers conservation efforts.

Asiatic wild ass used to be numerous from the Middle East to China. However, since the 19th century, their population has been reduced from several thousand to a few thousand. Currently, more than 600 Persian onagers are living in the wild, with the subpopulation along the border to Turkmenistan of Central Asia unseen since the 20th century.

== Habitat and distribution ==
Persian wild asses are known to inhabit mountain steppes, semidesert, or desert plains. They are usually found in desert steppes. Their largest population is found in Khar Turan National Park.

== Threats ==
The Persian onager is listed as endangered by IUCN Red List, as it is close to extinction. Currently, poaching for meat and hides, competition with livestock, and drought are the greatest threats to this species.

== Conservation status ==
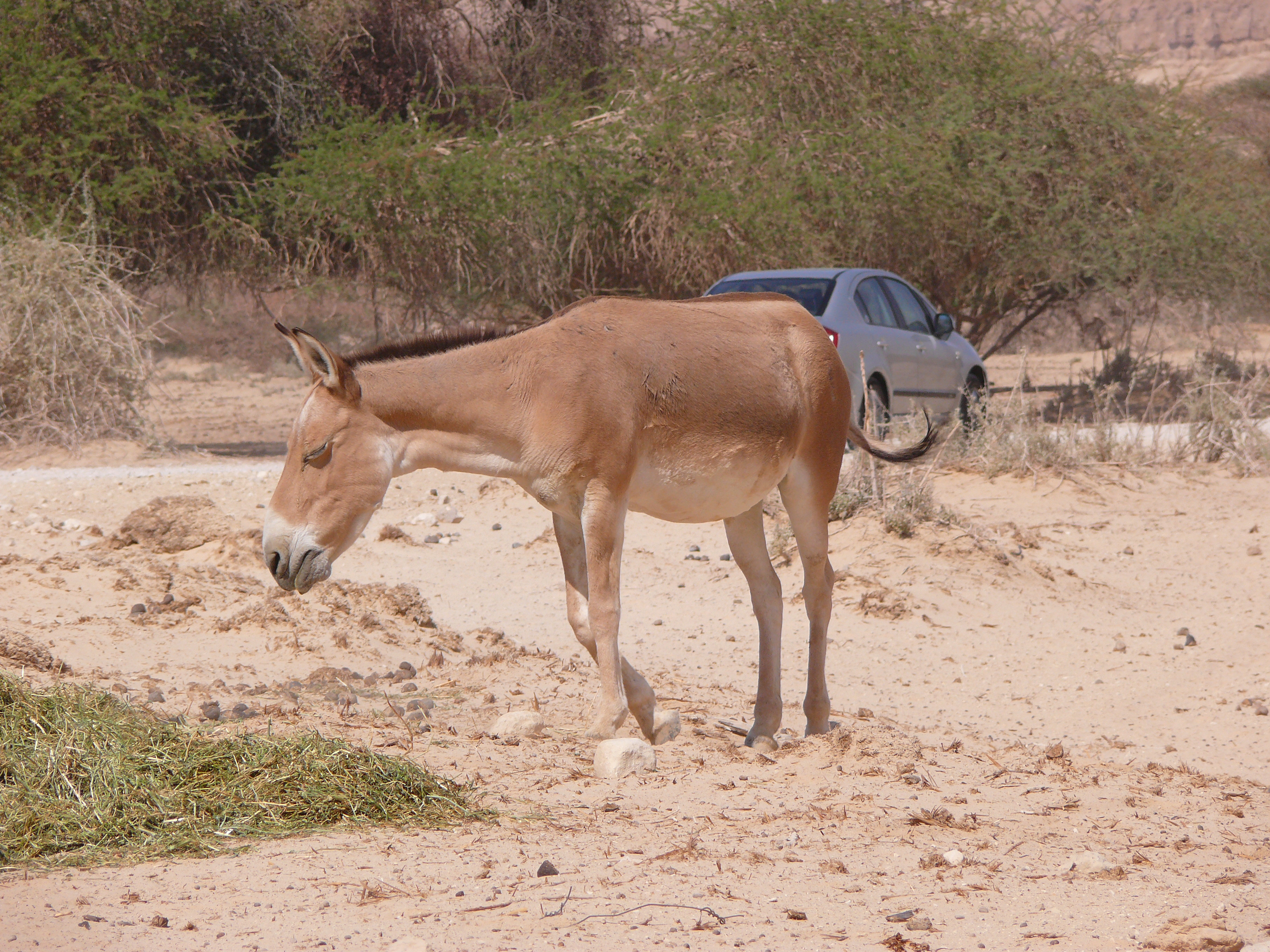
A Persian onager in the Yotvata Hai-Bar Nature Reserve, Israel

Asiatic wild asses are legally highly protected; hunting them is forbidden. The European Endangered Species Programme reserved for European Association of Zoos and Aquaria is helping save the Persian onager from extinction, by breeding them in captivity and reintroducing them to their former ranges, including in new locations once inhabited by Syrian onagers in Saudi Arabia, Israel, and Ukraine.

On August 30, 2014, Iranian officials reported that three Persian onagers were born in Khar Turan National Park reserve near Shahroud in Semnan province, where it also has the largest populations of the equids.

=== In captivity ===
A few Persian onagers are breeding in various zoos such as Chester, Whipsnade and Yotvata. The Smithsonian Conservation Biology Institute in Front Royal, Virginia, also breeds Persian onagers, including two born in June 2015. The first artificial insemination of any wild equid was in this species, and resulted in two Persian Onager foals at the Wilds conservation centre in Southeastern Ohio, in collaboration with experts from the Smithsonian Conservation Biology Institute.

=== Introduction projects ===
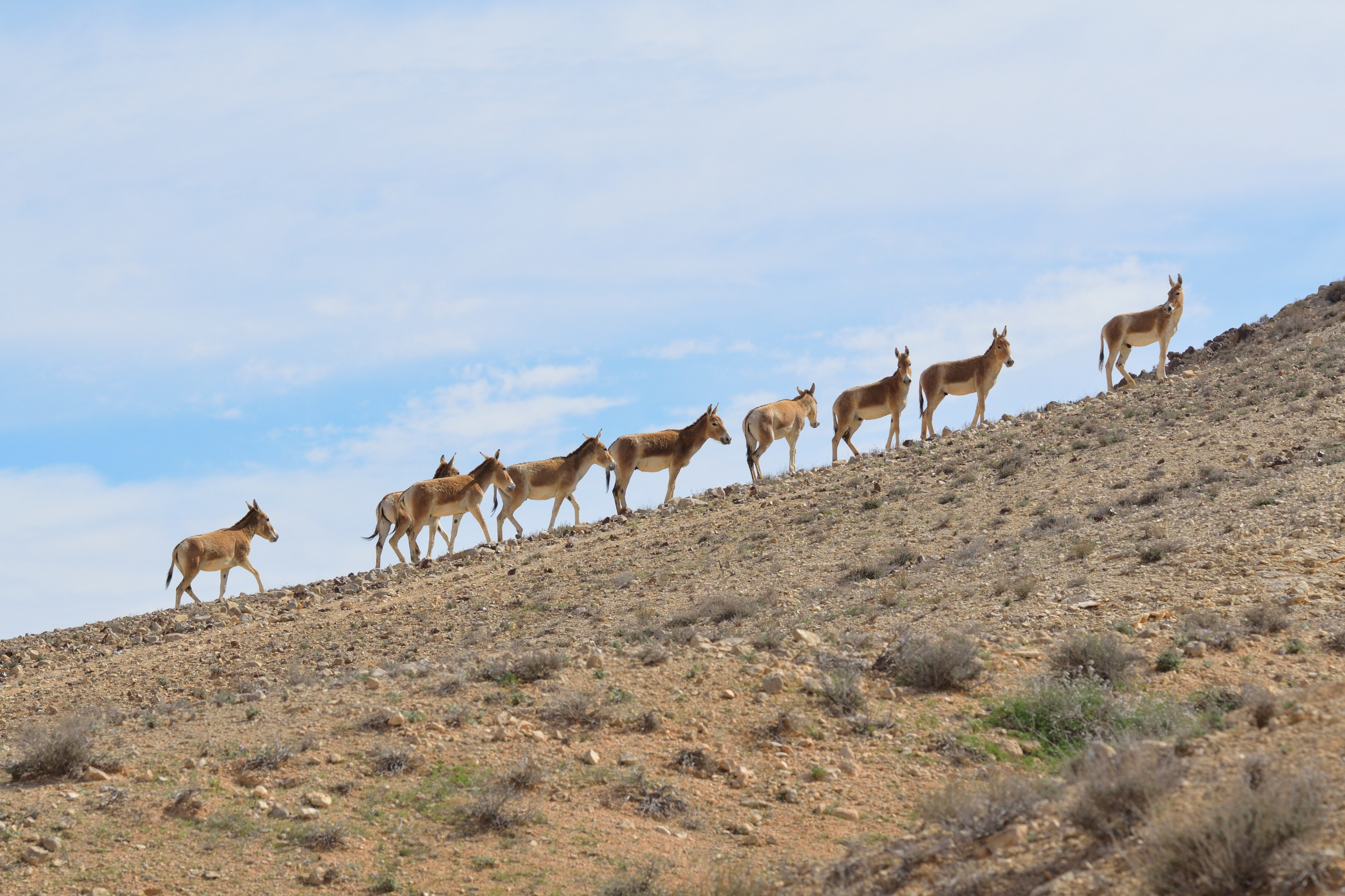
Introduced onagers in the Negev Mountains, Israel

Since 2003, Persian onagers have been introduced in Saudi Arabia, where the Syrian wild ass (E. h. hemippus) once lived. Introduced Persian onagers live in deserts foraging on grasses and branches or woodier plant material in dry seasons.

In 1968, 11 Persian and Turkmenian onagers were flown from their countries to Israel in exchange for mountain gazelles. These were bred in captivity at the Hai Bar Yotvata wildlife sanctuary. Together, they bred a few Persian/Turkmenian hybrids in Israel. Offspring were introduced into the wild in the Negev Mountains area, intended to replace the local subspecies gone extinct. As of 2024 this population had increased to between 500-600, with individuals causing damage to the local vineyards.

Reintroduction programs have also been implemented in Iran. In 2023, several Persian onagers were released in Kavir National Park as part of a conservation initiative supported by Department of Environment of Iran.
