= Gür =

Gür is a Turkish surname, which means bushy. It may refer to:

== Surnames ==
- Halil Gür (born 1951), Turkish Dutch author
- Olcay Gür (born 1991), Liechtensteiner football player of Turkish descent
- Ulf Kjell Gür (born 1951), Swedish theatre producer and singer/musician

== See also ==
- Hayri Gür Arena, indoor sporting arena in Turkey
- Tevfik Sırrı Gür Stadium, sports center in Turkey
- TCG Gür (1936), Basque-designed submarine of the Turkish Navy
