= Animal Math =

Educational book series

- Book cover of Cheetah Math
- Tiger Math (2000); Chimp Math (2002); Polar Bear Math (2004); Panda Math (2005); Cheetah Math (2007)
- Author: Ann Whitehead Nagda, Cindy Bickel, and San Diego Zoo
- Language: English
- Discipline: Mathematics
- Publisher: Henry Holt and Company
- Published: 2000-2007
- No. of books: 5

Animal Math is an educational book series featuring baby animals that introduces reader to mathematic principles. The series consists of five books: Tiger Math (2000), Chimp Math (2002), Polar Bear Math (2004), Panda Math (2005), and Cheetah Math (2007). On the right-hand pages, the books tell stories of baby animals cared for at either the Denver Zoo or San Diego Zoo who needed extra care when they were young. The left-hand pages discuss basic mathematic concepts using the animals as examples in problems.

Published by Henry Holt and Company, the books are authored by Ann Whitehead Nagda, with support from Cindy Bickel, an assistant at the Denver Zoo, or in collaboration with the San Diego Zoo.

== Books ==
=== Tiger Math (2000) ===
Tiger Math: Learning to Graph from a Baby Tiger (2000), co-written by Ann Whitehead Nagda and Cindy Bickel, teaches students about different types of graphs, including bar graphs, line graphs, picture graphs, and pie charts. The book features the Siberian tiger cub T. J., who was born at the Denver Zoo, then struggled to eat after his mother died.

Tiger Math is a Junior Library Guild book. Kirkus Reviews said the book provided "a delightful way to learn math".

=== Chimp Math (2002) ===
Chimp Math: Learning about Time from a Baby Chimpanzee (2002), co-written by Ann Whitehead Nagda and Cindy Bickel, teaches students about time, such as timelines and telling time on a clock. The book features Jiggs, a baby chimpanzee at the Denver Zoo who was ignored by his mother. Jiggs is kept in the zoo's nursery during the day and stays with Bickel in the evenings. While in the nursery, he spends time with a jaguar cub named Giorgio, before returning to the chimpanzee enclosure.

Kirkus Reviews praised Chimp Math, highlighting her strength of "combining multiple disciplines and teaching in a non-threatening, as-you-need-it manner".

=== Polar Bear Math (2004) ===
Polar Bear Math: Learning about Fractions from Klondike and Snow (2004), co-written by Ann Whitehead Nagda and Cindy Bickel, teaches students about fractions. The book features the polar bear cubs Klondike and Snow, who were cared for at the Denver Zoo after being abandoned. Along with a vet and another assistant at the zoo, Bickel learns how to care for the polar bears, who eventually thrive.

Polar Bear Math is a Junior Library Guild book.

=== Panda Math (2005) ===
Panda Math: Learning about Subtraction from Hua Mei and Mei Sheng (2005), written by Ann Whitehead Nagda in collaboration with the San Diego Zoo, teaches students about subtraction. The mathematical text discusses different ways to subtract, including "regrouping, subtracting each place value, thinking about doubles and adding up". The story features Hua Mei and Mei Sheng, panda cubs at the San Diego Zoo.

According to Kirkus Reviews, Nagda explains the different approaches to solving subtraction problems well, though they concede that "children will need additional support".

=== Cheetah Math (2007) ===
Cheetah Math: Learning about Division from Baby Cheetahs (2007), written by Ann Whitehead Nagda in collaboration with the San Diego Zoo, teaches students about division. The book features the baby cheetahs Majani and Kubali, who were raised at the San Diego Zoo.

Cheetah Math is a Junior Library Guild book. Sally Woolsey called the book "well done" and it is a popular item in many elementary school libraries. Kirkus Reviews called the book "a great addition to both the math and wild-animal conservation bookshelves". The School Library Journal also gave a favorable review, saying Cheetah Math "is a wonderful cross-curricular book and an appealing way to introduce math".

== Publication details ==
- Nagda, Ann Whitehead; Bickel, Cindy (2000). Tiger Math: Learning to Graph from a Baby Tiger. New York: Henry Holt and Company. ISBN 0-8050-6248-3.
- Nagda, Ann Whitehead; Bickel, Cindy (2002). Chimp Math: Learning about Time from a Baby Chimpanzee. New York: Henry Holt and Company. ISBN 0-8050-6674-8.
- Nagda, Ann Whitehead; Bickel, Cindy (2004). Polar Bear Math: Learning about Fractions from Klondike and Snow. New York: Henry Holt and Company. ISBN 978-0-8050-7301-0.
- Nagda, Ann Whitehead; San Diego Zoo (2005). Panda Math: Learning about Subtraction from Hua Mei and Mei Sheng. New York: Henry Holt and Company. ISBN 0-8050-7644-1.
- Nagda, Ann Whitehead; San Diego Zoo (2007). Cheetah Math: Learning about Division from Baby Cheetahs. Henry Holt and Company. ISBN 978-0-8050-7645-5.
