= Emergency response team (zoo) =

Zoo safety team

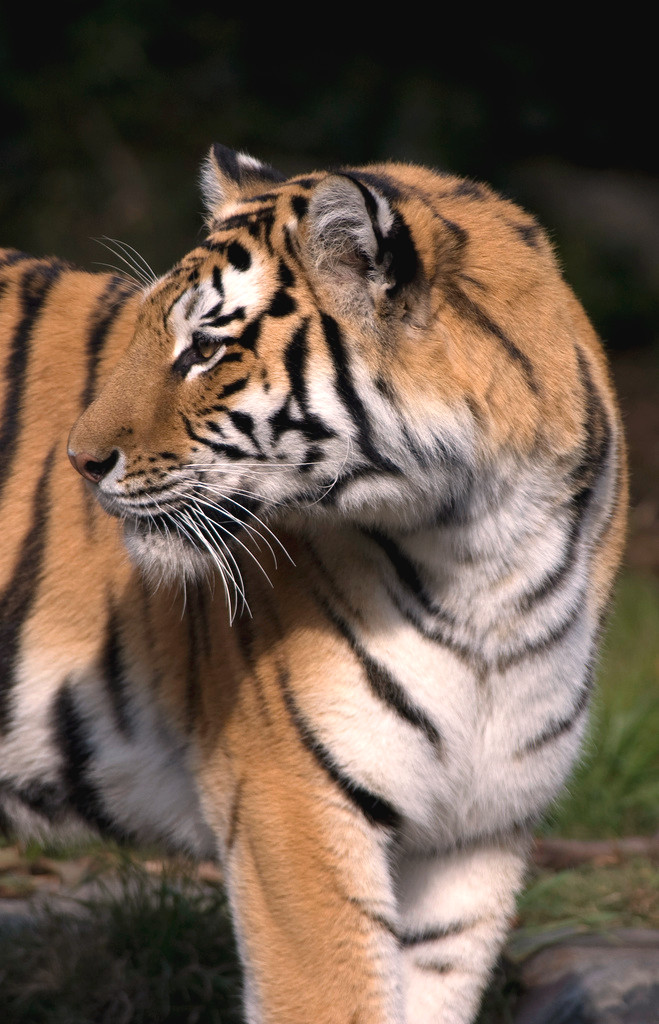
Tatiana, at San Francisco Zoo, was shot by the local police after she escaped and killed a man.

Zoo emergency response teams, also called emergency weapons teams, dangerous animal response teams, lethal restraint teams, or firearms emergency response teams, are teams that respond when zoo animals escape their enclosure and threaten zoo visitors and employees.

== Duties ==
Emergency response teams are responsible for the capture of escaped animals. Goals include: (listed in order of priority)

1. Ensure public safety
2. Ensure staff safety
3. Ensure animal safety
4. Recapture the animal

== Training ==
Emergency response teams are not full-time but are typically composed of zoo employees who have received special weapons training from a police agency. They are trained to use deadly force, but only as a last resort when the escaped animal is threatening the life of a human being. Zoos frequently perform training drills in order to keep the team up to date and ready for a real animal escape.

== Escaped animal procedures ==
When an animal escapes, guests are immediately evacuated from the area and escorted to secured buildings on zoo grounds by the zoo’s emergency response team (veterinarians armed with tranquilizer equipment, zoo firearms team and animal management staff). The zoo’s perimeter is sealed off for safety and is usually reopened after the animal is secured.

Australian zoos use a set of standard emergency radio codes for dealing with escaped animals. Many zoos in America have a similar policy.

- Code red - dangerous animal escape (lion, tiger, male giraffe).
- Code blue - hazardous animal escape (cheetah, camel, female giraffe, bongo).
- Code yellow - non-threatening animal escape (koala, meerkat, turtle).
- All clear - threat has been contained (usually only issued by the senior keeper).

== Notable events ==
=== Dallas Zoo ===
Many zoos created or enhanced their emergency response teams following a gorilla attack at the Dallas Zoo in 2004.

=== Denver Zoo ===
On February 24, 2007, an emergency response team at the Denver Zoo shot and killed a jaguar which had attacked a zookeeper. The zookeeper later died from her injuries.

=== Cincinnati Zoo ===
On May 28, 2016, a 3-year-old boy climbed through a public barrier at Gorilla World at around 4pm at the Cincinnati Zoo & Botanical Garden and fell into the exhibit’s moat. The two female gorillas in the exhibit were recalled immediately, but the third, a male named Harambe, remained in the yard with the child. The Zoo’s Dangerous Animal Response Team responded to the situation by fatally shooting the gorilla.

== Equipment ==
The following equipment is used by most zoos in the recapture of an escaped animal.

- Tranquilliser gun
- Firearm
- Pepper spray
- Fire extinguisher
- Water spray bottle
- Catch pole
- Net
- Fladry line (flags on a string)
- Broom
- Towels
- Tarpaulins
- First aid kit
- Flashlight

== See also ==
- Emergency management
