= Ugly Animal Preservation Society =

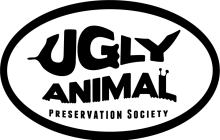
Logo of the Ugly Animal Preservation Society

The Ugly Animal Preservation Society is a comedy night with a conservation twist founded in Great Britain by biologist, writer and TV presenter Simon Watt to raise the profile of animal species which lack traditional aesthetically appealing characteristics. In part it is based on the belief that conservation of charismatic megafauna like pandas attracts disproportionate amounts of funding that could be better spent elsewhere. The organisation aims to protect less attractive animals such as the proboscis monkey which also face threats.

The first show was held in London in October 2012, with additional events elsewhere including at the 2013 Brighton Science Festival. Simon Makin found the Brighton event "a completely unique evening's entertainment, with plenty of knowledge nuggets thrown in amongst the giggles"., the Cheltenham Science Festival, the Edinburgh Science Festival, the Green Man Festival in Wales, the Winchester Science Festival, The British Science Festival, Bristol Big Green Week and other events and festivals around the country.

Simon comperes each evening where between six and eight comedians each have ten minutes to champion a different ugly endangered species. At the end of each evening the audience votes to elect one of the species. Previous performers have included Ellie Taylor, Helen Arney, Dan Schreiber, Sarah Bennetto, Suzi Ruffell, Steve Cross, Dean Burnett and Iszi Lawrence.

Current ugly animal mascots include: for London, the proboscis monkey; for Cambridge, forms of endangered sea slug; for Bristol and Cheltenham, the three toed sloth; for Winchester, the Titicaca water frog; for Brighton, the naked mole-rat and for Newcastle the dugong.

Promachoteuthis sulcus, championed by Jennifer Harrison, was elected to be the Edinburgh mascot. Jennifer referred to it as the "gob faced squid" because of its disturbingly human-like mouth. This name has since been adopted as the common name for the species.

In September 2013 the Ugly Animal Preservation Society teamed up with the National Science and Engineering Competition to create some online educational resources including eleven election style videos allowing people world wide to vote for what should become the general mascot for the society. The campaign gained international press coverage and was supported online by tweets from many celebrities including Stephen Fry, Liz Bonnin and Simon Pegg. Votes were counted by monitoring the number of likes on each of the election videos.

The winning animal, declared the ugliest animal on Earth, championed by Paul Foot and the official mascot of the society is the blobfish.
