= Denver Zoo Conservation Alliance =

Zoo in Denver, Colorado, US

Denver Zoo
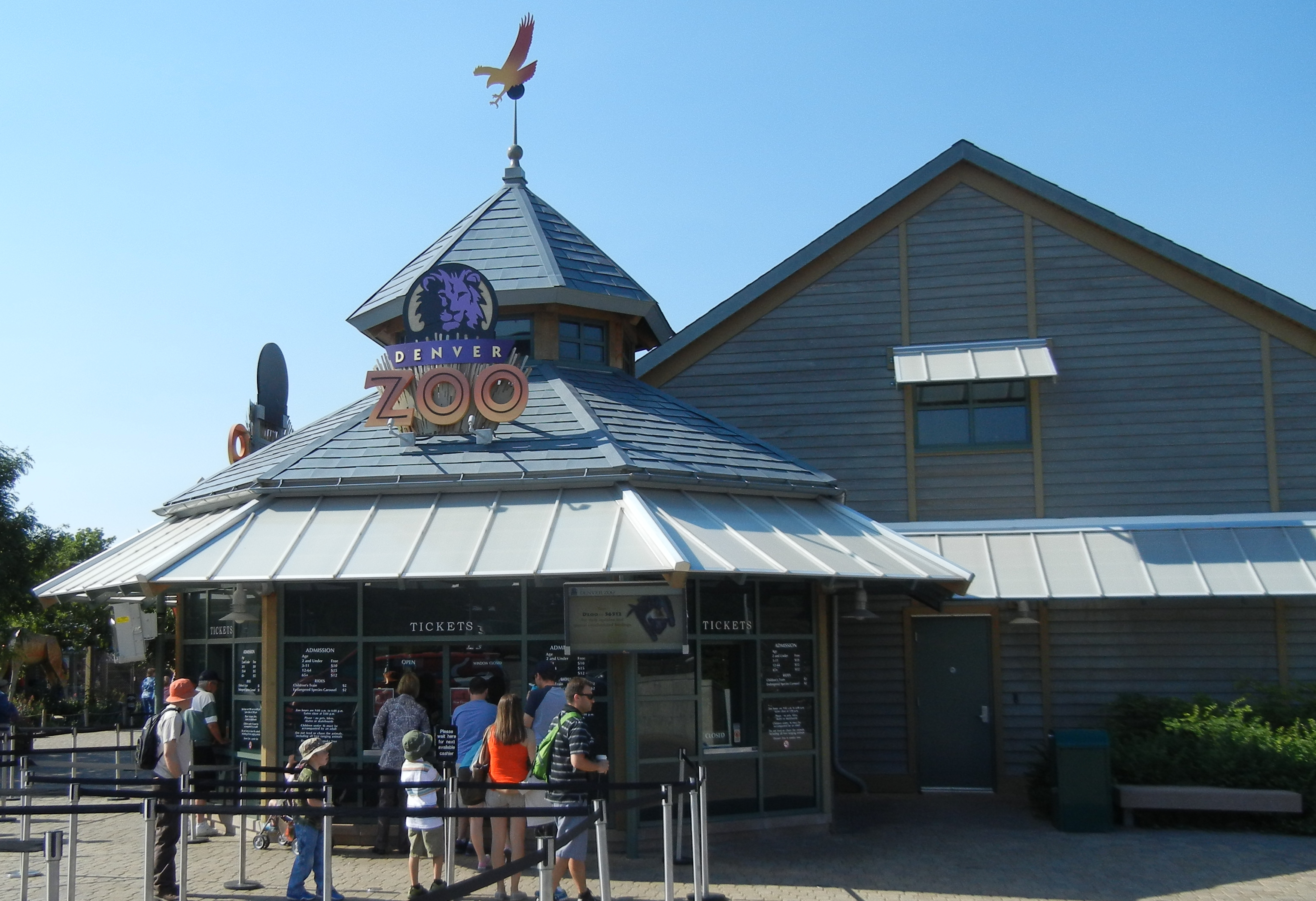
- Entrance pavilion
- Interactive map of Denver Zoo
- 39°45′N 104°57′W
- Date opened: 1896
- Location: Denver, Colorado, United States
- Land area: 80 acres (32 ha)
- No. of animals: 2,500 (2024)
- Annual visitors: 1.8 million (2022)
- Memberships: AZA, WAZA
- Major exhibits: Predator Ridge, Tropical Discovery, Toyota Elephant Passage, Primate Panorama, Bear Mountain, Harmony Hill, Down Under
- Website: www.denverzoo.org

Denver Zoo Conservation Alliance is an 80-acre (32 ha) nonprofit zoological garden and conservation organization located in City Park of Denver, Colorado, United States. Founded in 1896, it is operated by the Denver Zoological Foundation and funded in part by the Scientific and Cultural Facilities District (SCFD). Its other sources of funding are ticket sales and private donations. It is the most visited paid attraction in Denver.

Denver Zoo was started with the donation of an orphaned American black bear. With the construction of Bear Mountain, it became the first zoo in the United States to use naturalistic zoo enclosures rather than cages with bars. It expanded on this concept with Primate Panorama, featuring huge mesh tents and open areas for apes and monkeys, and with Predator Ridge, which has three separate areas through which animals are rotated so that their overlapping scents provide environmental enrichment. Toyota Elephant Passage, which opened on June 1, 2012, is divided into five areas for rotating the various species.

Denver Zoo is accredited by the (American) Association of Zoos and Aquariums (AZA) and American Humane and is also a member of the World Association of Zoos and Aquariums (WAZA). The zoo achieved ISO 14001 certification in 2009, was given the first AZA Green Award in 2011, and was named the "Greenest Zoo in the Country" at the World Renewable Energy Forum in 2012. In 2015, it was re-certified for ISO 14001 and achieved OHSAS 18001 certification, becoming only the fourth zoo in the world to get both certifications.

== History ==
=== Early years ===
Denver Zoo was founded in 1896 when an orphaned American black bear cub named Billy Bryan – short for William Jennings Bryan, after the contemporary American politician – was given to Mayor Thomas S. McMurray as a gift. McMurray gave the hard-to-manage cub to the keeper of City Park, Alexander J. Graham, who started the zoo with this animal. Other animals at the young zoo included native waterfowl at Duck Lake, native prairie dogs, pronghorn antelope which roamed the park, and a flock of Chinese pheasants, which later populated the eastern plains of the state.

As this collection grew, the newly-formed park board continued to focus almost exclusively on acquiring native animals, with a notable pheasant collection and rhesus macaques as the exceptions. Some of the most popular animals at the park were large herds of bison and elk.

In 1905, a population of red squirrels was added to the zoo's collection; this population grew rapidly and decimated the bird population at Duck Lake. A plan to shoot the squirrels was scrapped when citizens protested. Instead, as many squirrels as could be caught were sent to the Denver Mountain Parks.

=== Mid-20th century ===
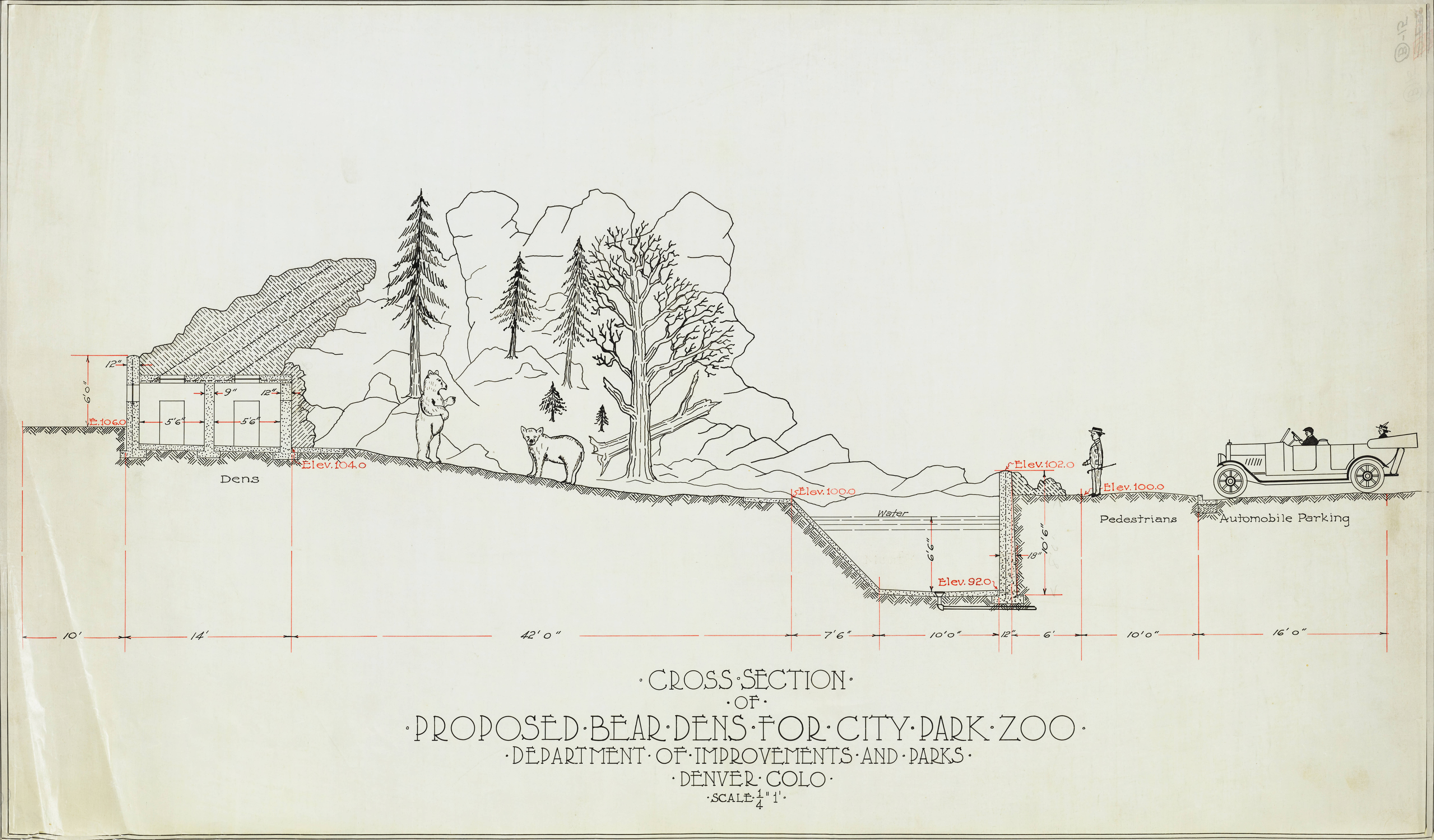
Cross-section view of a proposed bear pit, showing bear living space with trees and rocks, pedestrian areas, and automobile parking, about 1917.

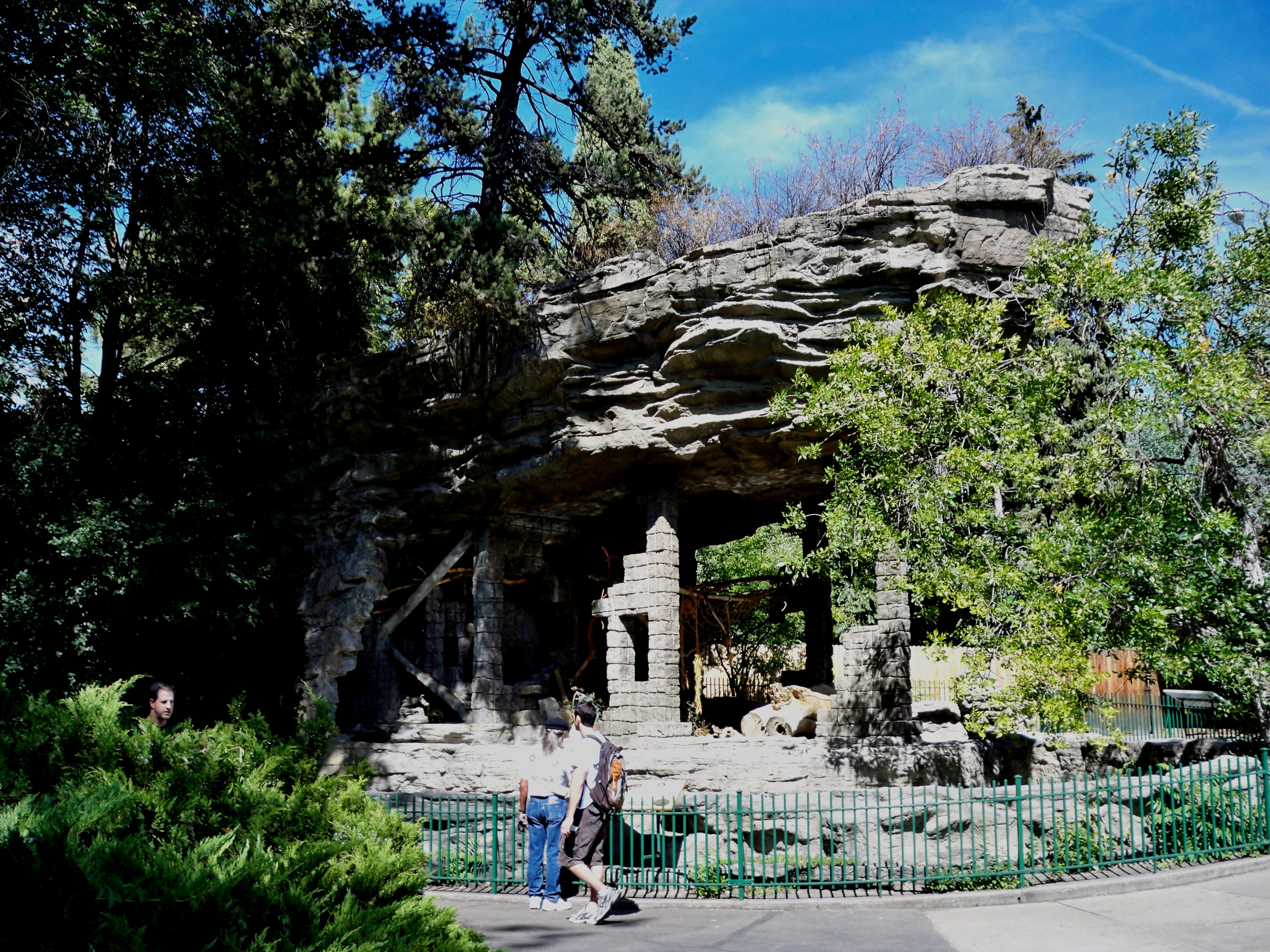
The south tip of Bear Mountain was originally intended for monkeys.

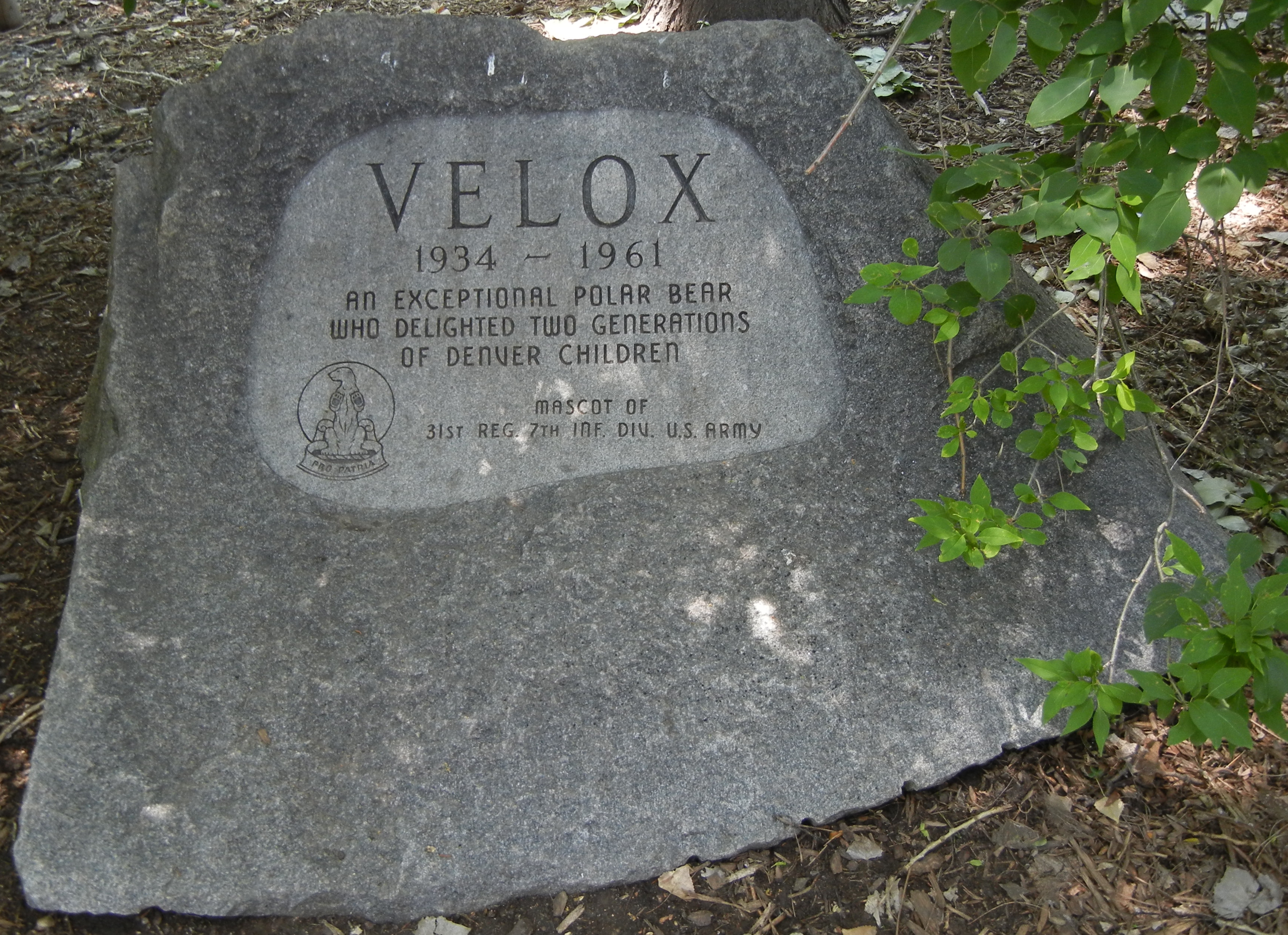
Memorial marker to Velox

The zoo was a motley menagerie until 1906, when Mayor Robert W. Speer declared that the zoo's "[p]rison bars can be done away with" in favor of "concrete rocks, waterfalls, trees, etc." Speer hired the city's landscape architect, Saco R. DeBoer, to draw up the plans for his renovation and appointed Victor H. Borcherdt as zoo director.

Borcherdt designed the Bear Mountain exhibit, which opened in 1918. This structure is 43 ft (13 m) tall and 185 ft (56 m) long, and cost $50,000 to build ($1,070,243 in 2025 dollars). It was built of dyed and textured concrete forms cast from Dinosaur Mountain just outside Morrison, Colorado. Hidden moats replaced cage bars, and native plants and an artificial stream enhanced the natural look. The two main exhibits originally housed polar bears and grizzly bears.

The south tip of the exhibit was designed to resemble Mesa Verde National Park. It originally housed monkeys, but due to escape problems, California sea lions were housed there instead. Between 1941 and 1961 it housed a female polar bear named Velox, who became the mascot of the 31st Infantry Regiment in 1952. Velox died at the zoo in 1961 and a memorial stone for her is displayed at the zoo. Bear Mountain established Denver as one of the foremost American zoos, and the Saint Louis Zoo hired Borcherdt after seeing the exhibit.

Although other zoos in the region made extensive use of New Deal funds to upgrade their facilities, only one notable addition was made to Denver Zoo between 1918 and 1950. Monkey Island was built in 1937 using funds from the Works Progress Administration. Mayor Benjamin F. Stapleton funded the zoo very little, and it was in poorly maintained condition when Mayor J. Quigg Newton was elected in 1947. Newton hired DeBoer, the architect involved with the zoo's design forty years before, to plan a rebirth. Starting with the 1950 overhaul of Monkey Island, the zoo has steadily added to and improved its exhibits.

The Denver Zoological Foundation was created in 1950, the same year that the zoo acquired its first elephant, Cookie. A children's zoo was opened in 1951 (since replaced by Primate Panorama). A perimeter fence was built in 1957, defining the zoo as a separate area but still within City Park. Automobile traffic in the zoo was completely eliminated in 1959. Pachyderm Habitat was opened the same year, and Cookie was joined by a second elephant, Candy.

The zoo opened the Feline House in 1964, a Giraffe House in 1966, and an Animal Hospital in 1969. Bird World was opened in 1975, followed by the Mountain Sheep Habitat in 1979, Northern Shores for polar bears, Arctic foxes, North American river otters, and pinnipeds in 1987, and Wolf Pack Woods in 1988.

The Marine Mammal Protection Act of 1972 made it impossible to keep the polar bears and sea lions in the Bear Mountain enclosure. This, along with its deteriorating condition, led to a $250,000 renovation of the exhibit starting in 1987 ($708,480 in 2025 dollars). The exhibit reopened in 1989 with grizzly bears and Asiatic black bears occupying the northern two exhibits and coatis in the southern tip.

=== 1990s-present ===
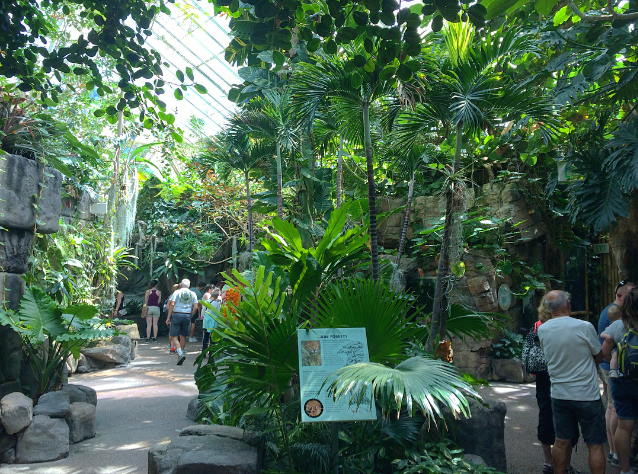
Interior of Denver Zoo's Tropical Discovery

In 1993, the zoo opened the $11.5 million Tropical Discovery exhibit. Designed by the Denver architectural firm Anderson Mason Dale, this indoor tropical garden topped by glass pyramids is the public aquarium and herpetarium of Denver Zoo, and its opening doubled both the number of species and the number of animals at the zoo. Along with the animals, 90% of which had never been on display at the zoo, there are over 250 species of plants represented in the exhibit.

On November 6, 1994, twin polar bear cubs Klondike and Snow were born to a first-time mother named Ulu, who rejected the cubs. They were successfully raised by zoo staff and became a popular attraction. Their story is commemorated at Denver Zoo by a bronze sculpture located near the former polar bear (now grizzly bear) exhibit.

On February 24, 2007, a jaguar mauled zookeeper Ashlee Pfaff inside the animal's enclosure. The jaguar was shot and killed by the zoo's emergency response team while rescuing Pfaff, who later died of her injuries at a local hospital. This event occurred despite zoo policy prohibiting direct contact between keepers and big cats. An investigation by the zoo concluded the attack was the result of human error by Pfaff. The zoo has not had jaguars since 2010.

In 2009, Denver Zoo was the first zoo in the United States to achieve ISO 14001 certification. City Park rebuilt its greenhouses in 2009, providing the zoo with a dedicated greenhouse as part of this project.

That same year, Denver Zoo celebrated the birth of an endangered aye-aye, the first of the species to be conceived and born in a North American zoo. The zoo has continued to have a successful breeding program.

In 2012, the zoo opened the $50 million Toyota Elephant Passage. The exhibit was originally announced in 2006 as Asian Tropics. It was opened to the general public on June 1, 2012 as the largest bull elephant habitat in the world.

In 2015, following conservation work around Lake Titicaca in Peru, Denver Zoo welcomed 20 Lake Titicaca frogs from the Huachipa Zoo and later became the first zoo outside South America to breed the rare amphibians. Some have moved to other institutions in hopes of building a healthy captive population that can be released back into the lake.

The zoo added several interactive and immersive exhibits in the late 2010's and early 20's. These included The Edge in 2017, Harmony Hill in 2019 and Down Under in 2024.

In 2024, the zoo announced the acquisition of 570 acres in Weld County. This land, donated by the Lembke family, will be dubbed the Lembke Family Preserve. The new facility will not be open to the public but will increase space the zoo can use for breeding and reintroduction programs seven-fold. This is the first expansion outside Denver Zoo's 80-acre main campus in its history. Also in 2024, the zoo rebranded to reflect its ongoing focus on conservation and education and moving forward will be known as the Denver Zoo Conservation Alliance.

== Exhibits ==
=== Primate Panorama ===
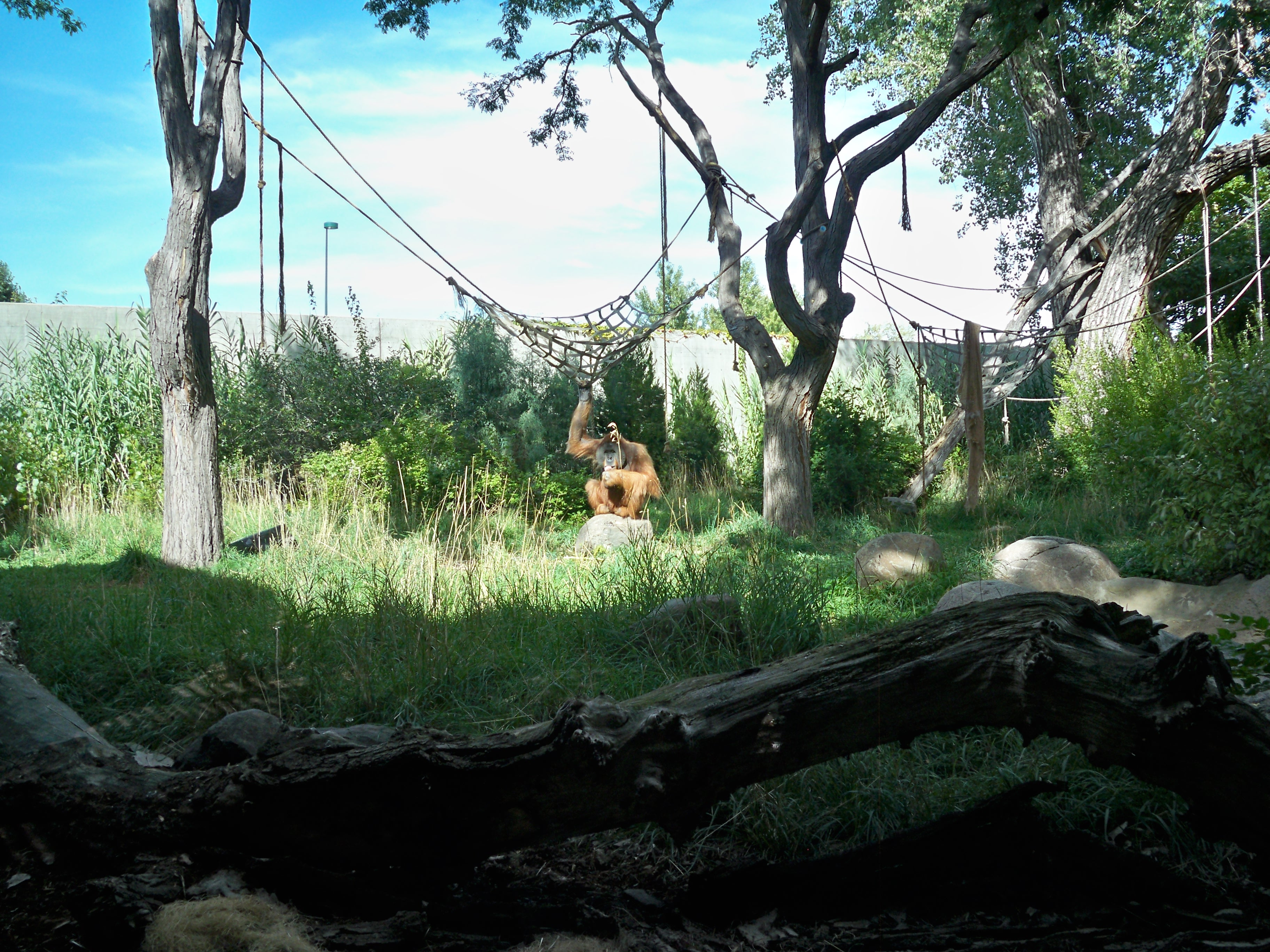
Primate Panorama showcases orangutans

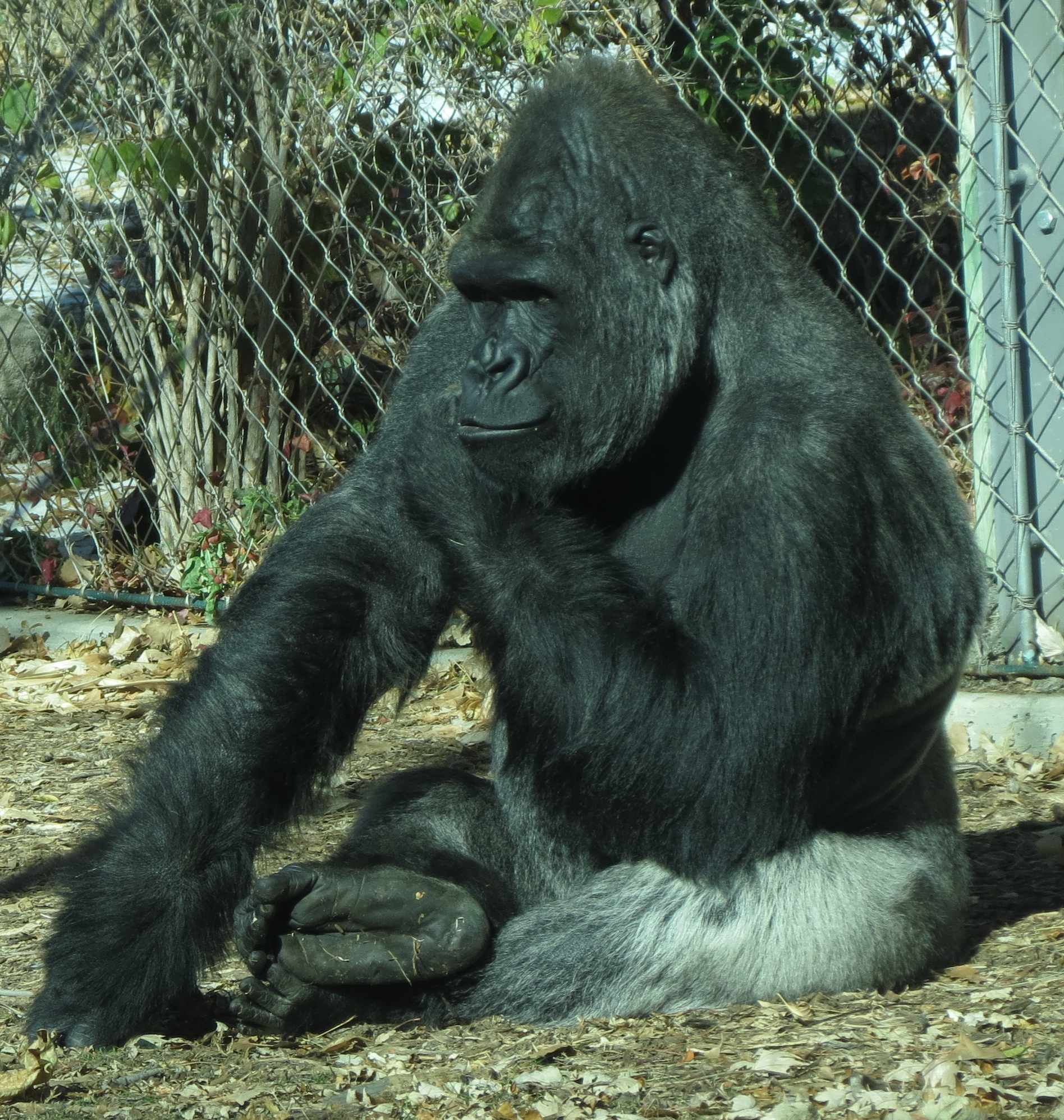
Gorilla at the zoo

Primate Panorama spreads over 7 acres (2.8 ha) and primarily houses apes and other larger primates. Tree-dwelling apes and monkeys live in open-air wire mesh tents that soar four stories high and cover more than an acre of ground. Inside these tents, primates like Wolf's guenons, black-and-white colobus, red-crowned mangabeys, siamangs and black-handed spider monkeys can play and climb on twisting vines. Western lowland gorillas roam freely, climbing ropes and taking afternoon hammock naps in one of the largest gorilla habitats in the world. Sumatran orangutans have their own outdoor habitat where they can climb trees and swing in hammocks.

The Emerald Forest pavilion is situated near the entrance to Primate Panorama. It features a meandering trail through diorama replicas exhibiting many small primates amongst other rainforest animals. Animals housed here include the aye-aye, brown capuchin, cotton-top tamarin, golden lion tamarin, white-faced saki, Bali mynah and Prevost's squirrel. Connecting to the building is an island exhibit that rotates several lemur species, including ring-tailed lemurs and red-ruffed lemurs.

The nearby Shamba offers a view of a Central West African village and is home to red river hogs, mandrills, and cape porcupines. An aviary further down the trail showcases rhinoceros hornbills.

The Forest Aviary is a 7,500-square-foot (700 m^{2}) area richly landscaped and enclosed in a nearly invisible wire mesh. Visitors can walk around inside with the birds, which include unique and endangered species like (depending on the season) waldrapp ibises, Indian peafowl and a wide array of waterfowl.

=== Africa ===
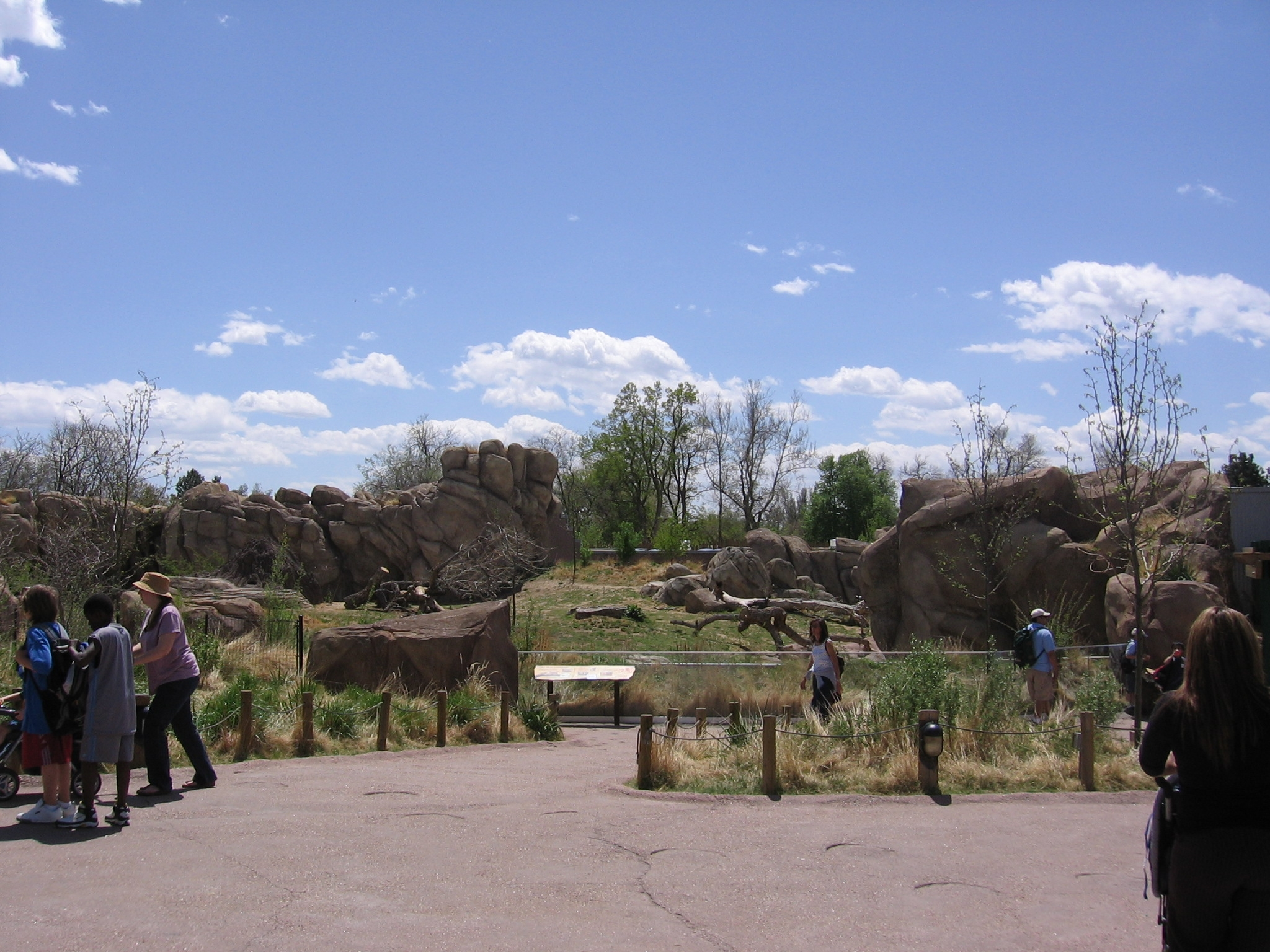
Predator Ridge is designed to represent the African savanna

Predator Ridge, completed in 2004 and the first exhibit most visitors encounter, is a large exhibit representing the African savanna. It has the ability to rotate multiple groups of Southern African lions and spotted hyenas, whose overlapping scents provide environmental enrichment. Other small African animals like dwarf crocodiles, African rock pythons, puff adders, and leopard tortoises are exhibited in and around the Pahali Ya Simba pavilion. A habitat for African penguins, featuring a 10,000 gallon pool with underwater viewing, was completed in 2021 and is located directly inside the front entrance.

African hoofed mammals are generally housed in the center of the zoo's main circular path. Species in the hoofed mammal yards include Grevy's zebras, reticulated giraffes, okapis, Somali wild asses, Cape buffalo and a variety of antelope species including eastern bongo, addax, lesser kudu, southern gerenuk, yellow-backed duiker and red-flanked duiker. Some of these yards are mixed-species exhibits and include bird species like Abyssinian ground hornbills, west African crowned cranes and ostriches. There are also yards for African wild dogs, Chacoan peccaries, llamas and a Vietnamese pot-bellied pig.

=== Asia ===
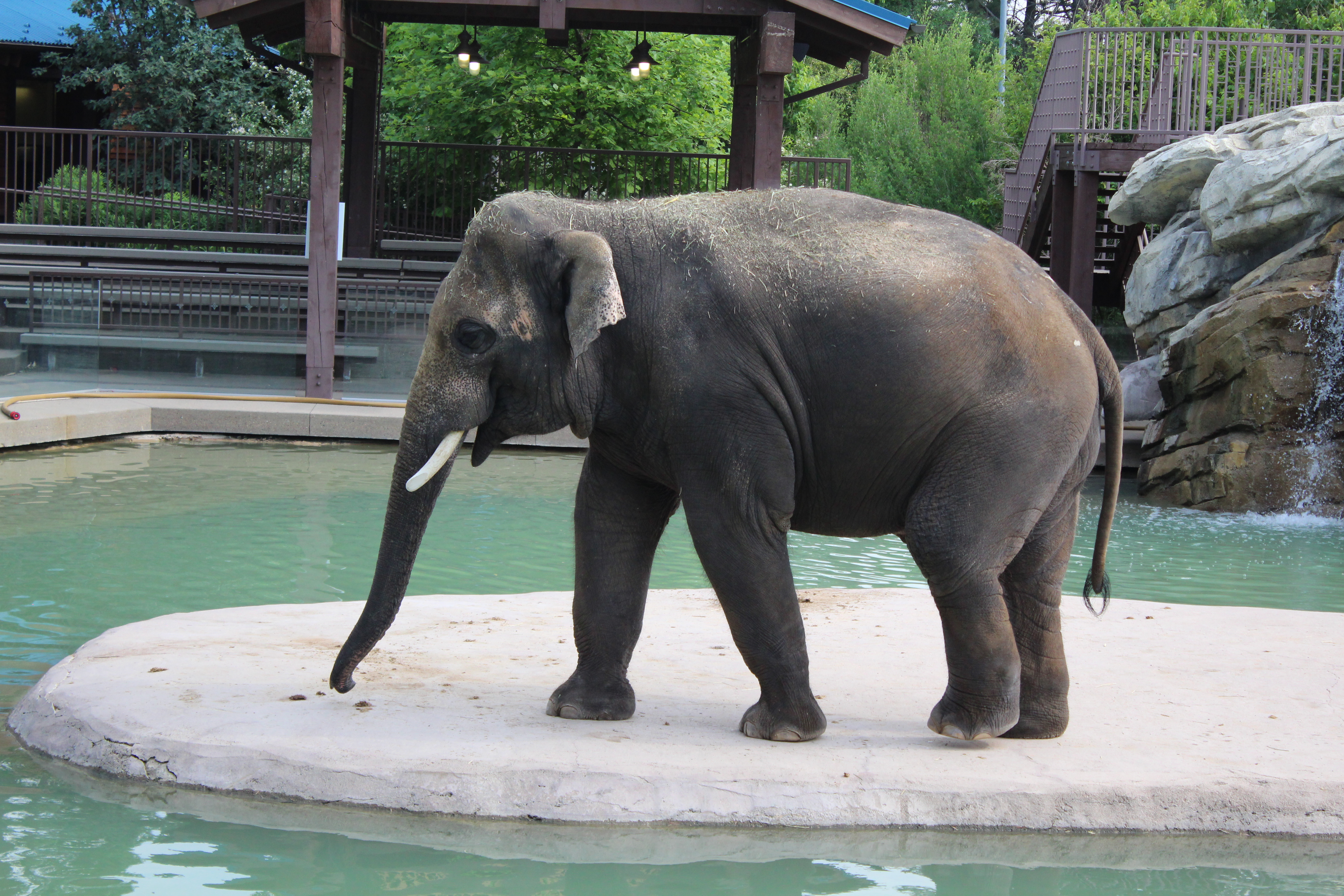
Asian elephant

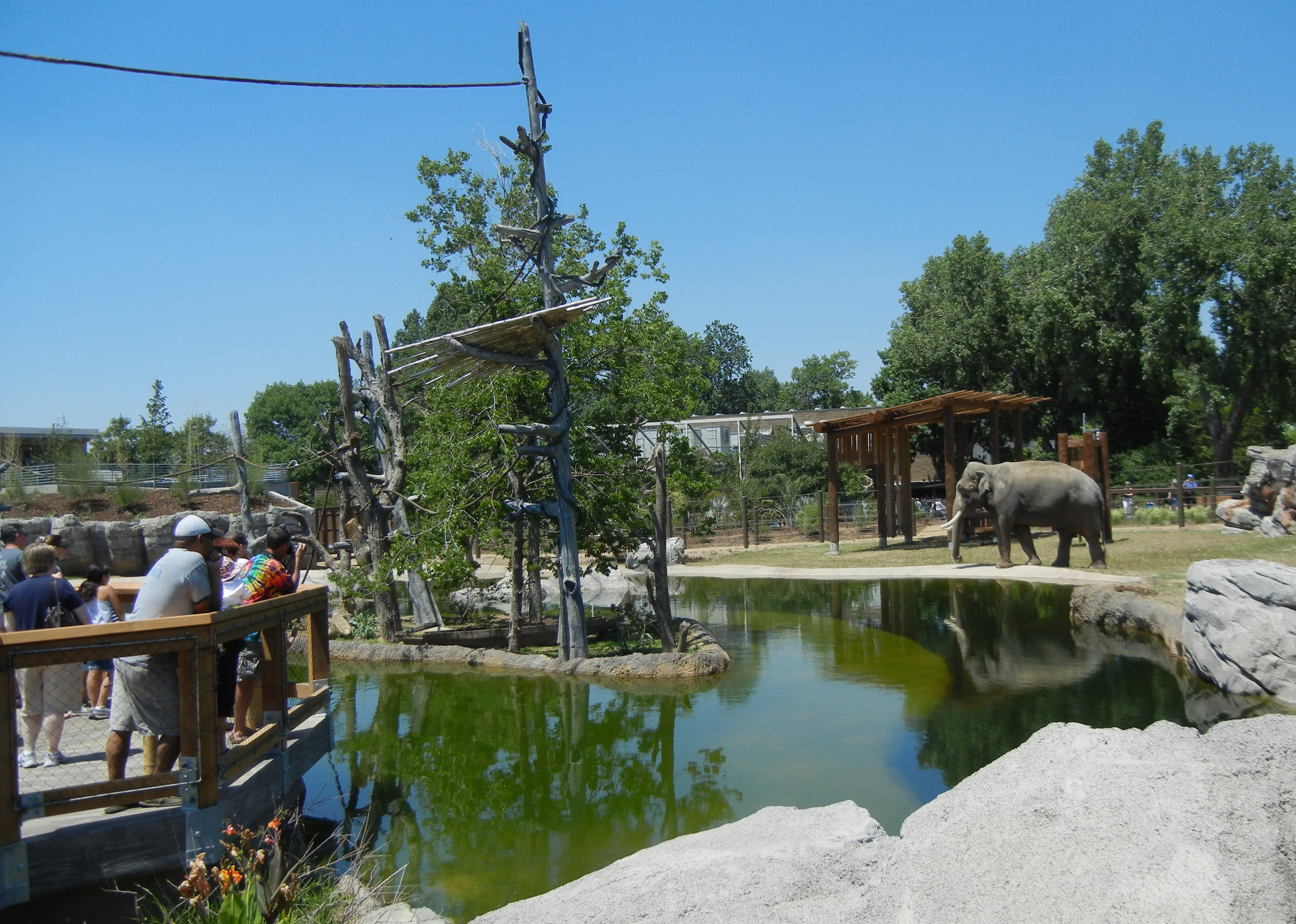
One of the gibbon islands at the elephant exhibit

Toyota Elephant Passage is a $50 million 10-acre (4.0 ha) exhibit. At its opening, it was the largest bull elephant habitat in the world, designed to house up to 12 elephants, 8 of them bulls. This arrangement allows the zoo to conduct behavioral research related to the recent discovery that bull elephants (originally thought to be solitary) form loose bachelor herds in the wild when not breeding with matriarchal herds. The exhibit houses Asian elephants and other animals such as greater one-horned rhinoceros, Malayan tapirs and babirusas which rotate among different habitats in the same style as Predator Ridge. It includes more than 2 miles (3.2 km) of trails for the animals, and pools in the exhibit contain a total of 1,100,000 US gallons (4,200,000 L). Northern white-cheeked gibbons swing directly over a boardwalk for visitors, traveling between three islands. Clouded leopards and sarus cranes live in nearby yards. The exhibit includes an indoor facility for smaller species like fishing cats, Asian small-clawed otters, Indian flying foxes, black-breasted leaf turtles and green tree pythons and it provides important breeding facilities for the Indian rhino and Asian elephant in North America.

The exhibit opened with two female elephants (Mimi and Dolly) and two bull elephants (Bodhi and Groucho). The zoo made history in 2013 by transporting Billy, a bull elephant from Belgium's Antwerp Zoo, via plane to the new exhibit. This marked the first time in over 30 years an Asian elephant had been imported into the United States and one of the few times the genetics of the European population would mix with the North American population. In October 2018, bull elephants Chuck and Jake came to the exhibit from the African Lion Safari in Ontario. This move made Denver's herd the largest Asian elephant bachelor herd in the world with five bulls.

On February 22, 2020, the first greater one-horned rhino calf in the zoo's history was born as the result of artificial insemination.

At its opening, the exhibit contained a waste-to-energy gasification system that burned organic waste (uneaten food, animal waste, etc...) in an oxygen-deprived environment in order to create energy. The system powered outdoor hot tubs for the elephants and Denver Zoo's goal was to be "Zero Waste" by 2020, powering the whole facility with waste. Those involved with the project reported that no airborne byproducts would be released when the system was running but surrounding residents were still concerned that the gasification process would create an unpleasant odor around the zoo. These concerns resulted in ending the gasification project at Denver Zoo. Since the decision in 2015, the zoo is seeking partners to continue the project with offsite.

Nonetheless, the exhibit and its buildings have received LEED Platinum certification from the U.S. Green Building Council.

The Edge is an exhibit modeled after the pine forests of Russia for the zoo's Amur tigers. Two yards with large pools and pathways that wander over visitors' heads provide enrichment and exercise for the tigers. It opened to the public in March 2017, replacing Wolf Pack Woods, which opened in 1988. Nearby, Asian hoofed mammal yards house Bactrian camels and one of only a few breeding herds of Mongolian wild horses in North American zoos.

=== Latin America ===
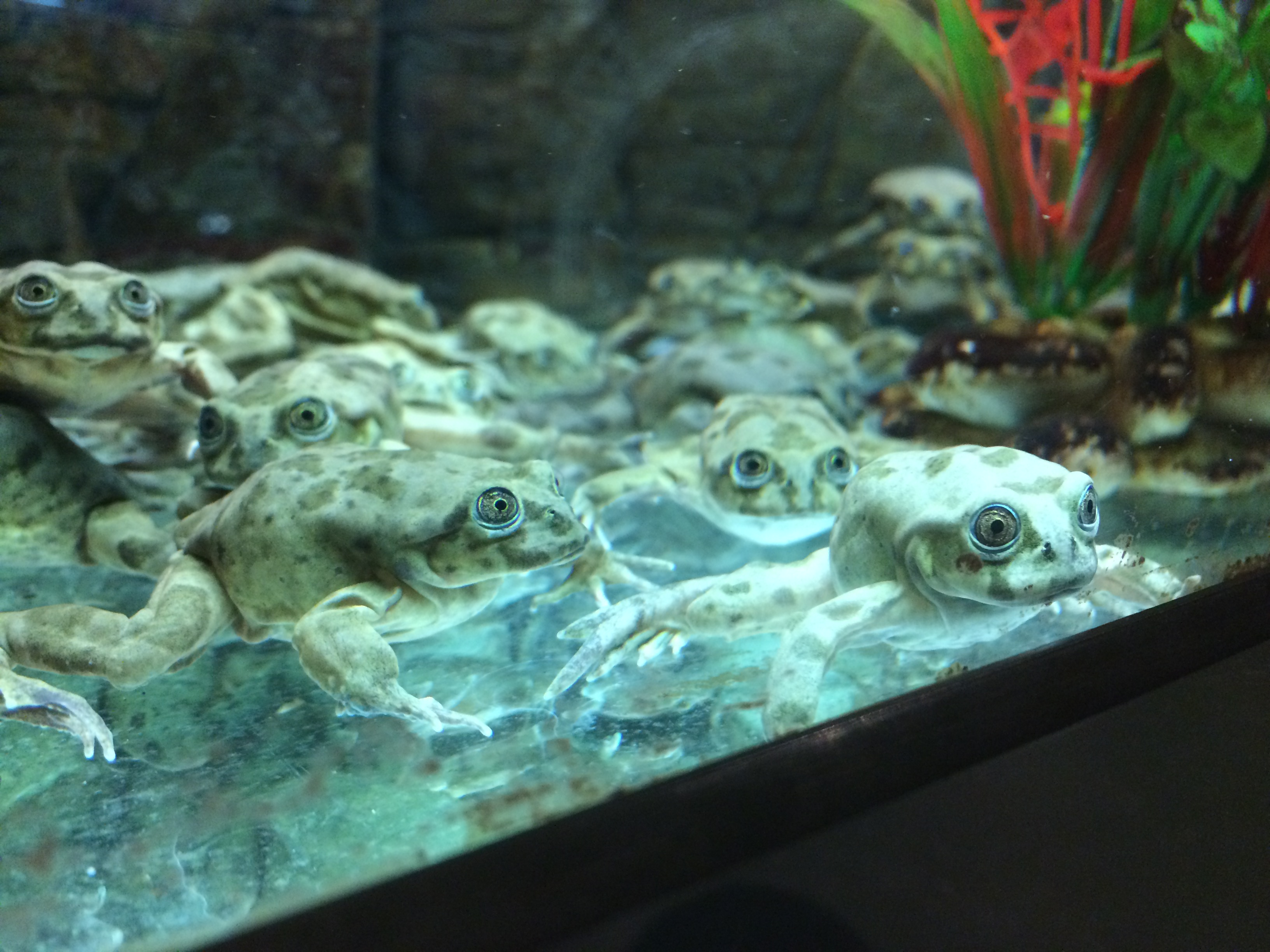
Lake Titicaca frogs in Tropical Discovery.

Tropical Discovery was opened in 1993 as the zoo's herpetarium and aquarium. The building explores several tropical environments and displays mammals, reptiles, fish, amphibians and insects from these areas. The trip begins with a view into a South American river with different species of river fishes then continues to a cave featuring several bat species including the short-tailed bat, Jamaican fruit bat and vampire bat, as well as blind cave fish. A snake exhibit hidden inside a Mayan temple features venomous species from around the world including the king cobra, Brazilian fer-de-lance and Gila monsters. Animals seen in the rainforest area include black howler monkeys, capybaras, Linne's two-toed sloths, archerfish and an array of poison dart frogs. Further on, visitors are immersed in a coral reef with clownfish, lionfish, spotted garden eels and more. Around the corner, a gallery of North American snakes is located across from a pair of pools showcasing an alligator snapping turtle as well as other North American reptiles and fish. Further on, the Siamese crocodile also enjoys a large pool near a Matamata turtle display and the Discovery Room, which features other small species like the frilled lizard.

Dragons of Komodo, inside Tropical Discovery, was the largest Komodo dragon exhibit of its kind when it opened in 1999 and is still one of the largest Komodo dragon exhibits in the country. In addition to Komodo dragons, it is home to other island reptiles like rhinoceros iguanas and Jamaican boas.

Stingray Cove is a seasonal, interactive exhibit featuring an 18,000 gallon shaded open-air aquarium housing cownose rays, white-spotted and brown-banded bamboo sharks, southern stingrays, shovelnose guitarfish and bonnethead sharks. Guests are able to gently touch, feel, and feed the rays as they swim around the tank. Admission to the exhibit (which includes one piece of food for feeding to the rays) costs $5 in addition to zoo entry. The exhibit opened in June 2020.

The zoo's new Flamingo Habitat opened in 2023, located just outside Tropical Discovery. It provides Chilean and American flamingoes with pools and marshes replicating the Andean highlands.

The Sea Lion Habitat for California sea lions was unveiled in 2025 and replaced the habitat that opened as part of Northern Shores in 1987. Upgrades include a large saltwater pool and state-of-the-art filtration system that reduces the exhibit's water usage by 8 million gallons a year. An expanded underwater viewing window and rocky shores and islands for sunbathing give guests opportunities to connect with the residents.

=== Into The Wild ===
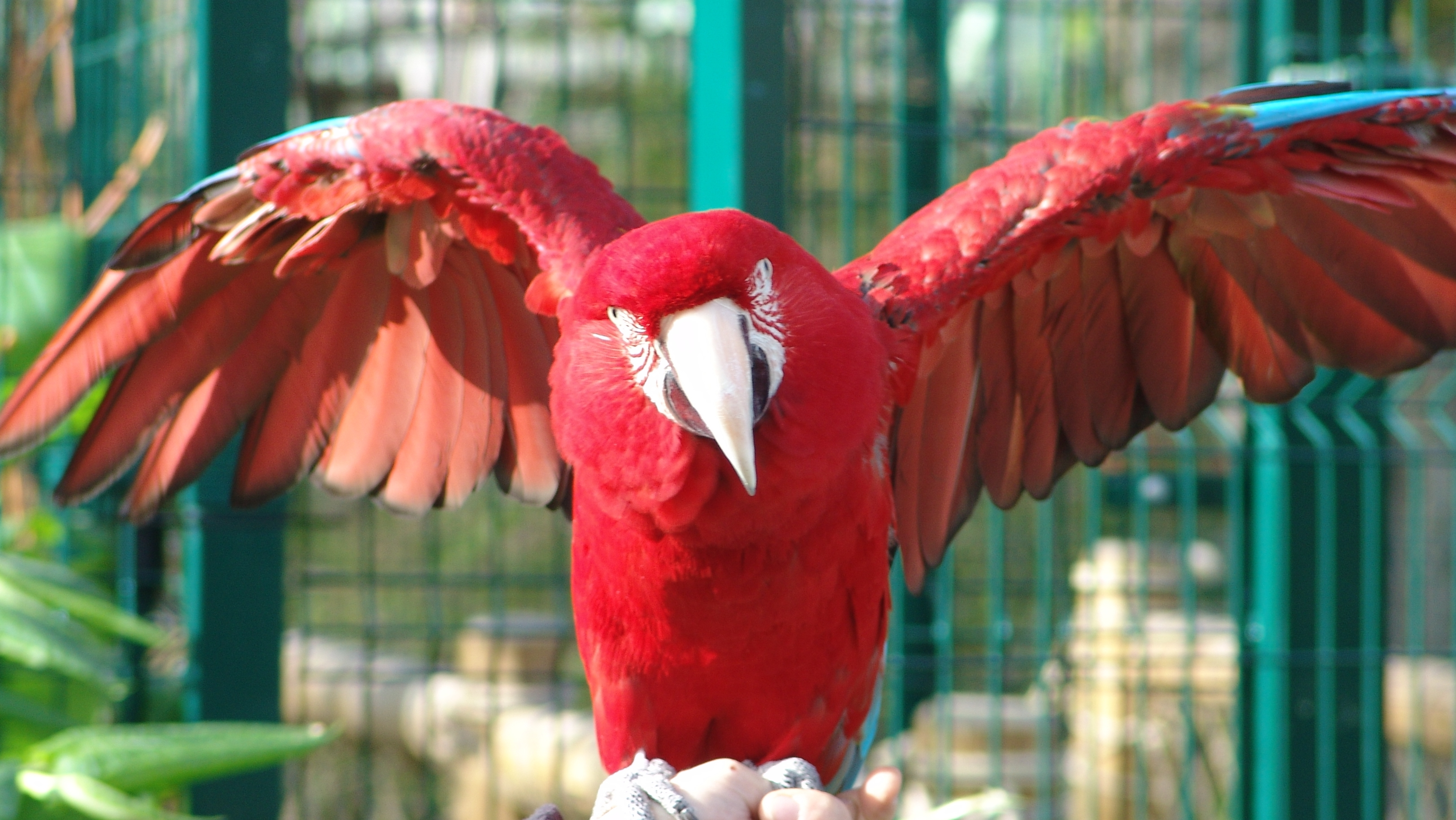
Green-winged Macaw (Ara chloropterus)

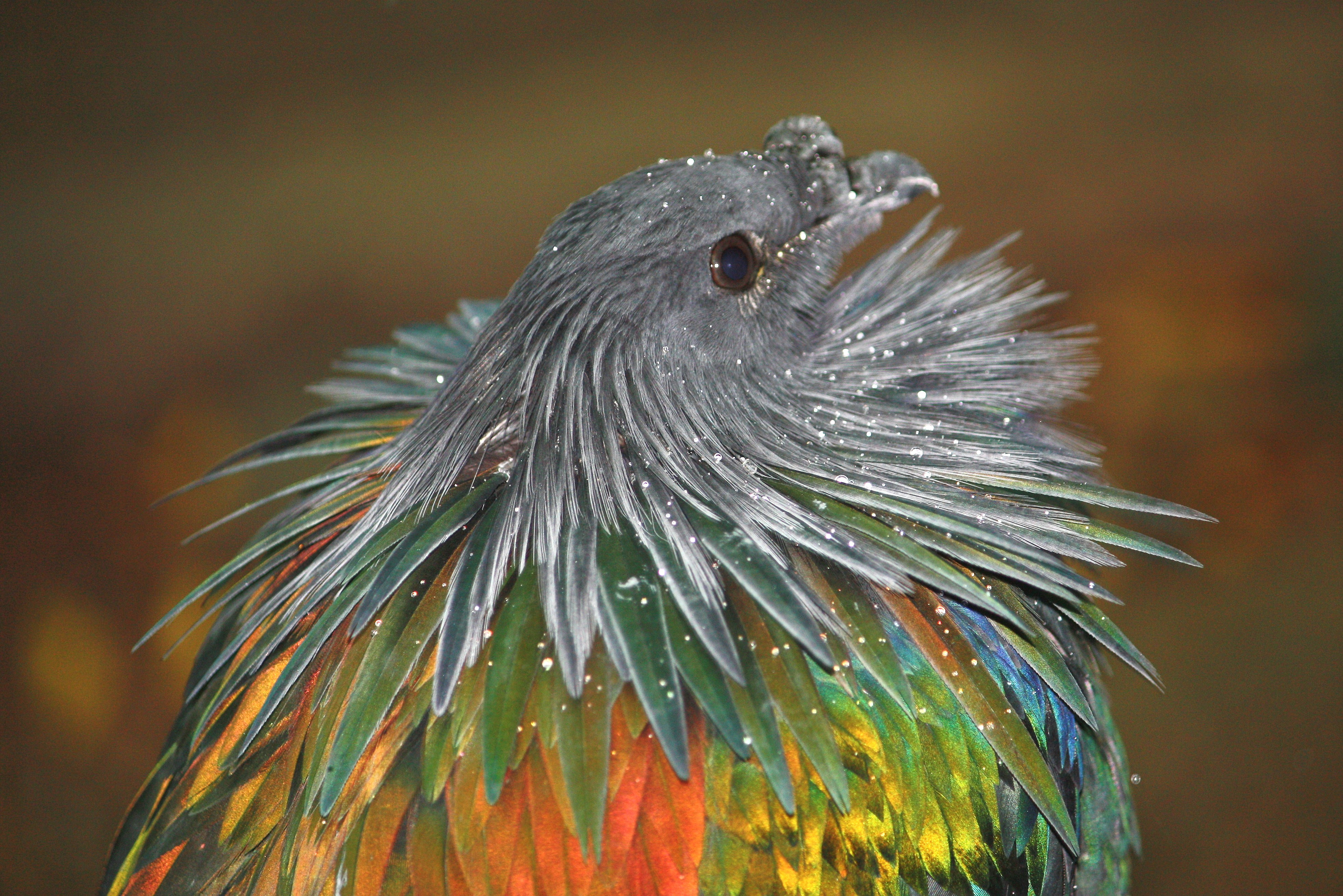
Nicobar Pigeon (Caloenas nicobarica)

The original aviary, the oldest aviary at the zoo, currently houses Andean condors.

Lorikeet Adventure, the Nurture Trail, and the Avian Propagation Center all opened in 2006. Lorikeet Adventure is a large, open-air mesh tent where visitors can mingle with and feed a variety of lorikeet species. The Nurture Trail is a short trail through a forested glade home to two exhibits for breeding pairs of large birds like red-crowned cranes and hooded cranes. The trail then goes past smaller outdoor enclosures attached to the Avian Propagation Center which is one of the largest and most complex buildings devoted to breeding birds in the country. Depending on their needs, species in the public-facing enclosures often rotate but can include Victoria crowned pigeons, azure-winged magpies and palm cockatoos.

Bear Mountain is an historic exhibit on the National Register of Historic Places and originally opened in 1918. It is one of the first natural-style zoo exhibits in North America and the first to use simulated concrete rocks. It underwent a $250,000 restoration between 1987 and 1989. Although the exhibit's residents have moved to Harmony Hill, the structure remains for visitors to appreciate.

Mountain Sheep Habitat was opened in 1979. It contains two natural-style "mountains" housing Rocky Mountain bighorn sheep and desert bighorn sheep.

Monkey Island was built in 1937 with funds from the Works Progress Administration. It was rehabilitated in 1950. In 2023, the island's brown capuchins were moved to the Emerald Forest building.

Monkey House, facing Monkey Island, was the original primate exhibit in the zoo. In recent years, it served as a winter residence for the capuchins but as of 2023 it is no longer in use. The brick building is considered a historic structure and repurposing of some kind is likely.

=== Down Under ===
Down Under is a new exhibit exploring Australia. Water-wise landscaping resembles the animals' native ecosystems and woven throughout the exhibit are original multimedia artworks telling the story of First Nations peoples. It features a walk-through red-necked wallaby and red kangaroo yard, a two-story habitat for Huon tree kangaroos and a habitat for Southern cassowaries. Down Under opened in May 2024.

=== Harmony Hill ===
Harmony Hill provides a habitat for grizzly bears modeled after the fictional Harmony Hill State Park. Another nearby habitat is designed to resemble a backyard in order to illustrate and provide solutions for human-wildlife conflict. The second habitat is home to two rescued leucistic raccoons. Harmony Hill opened in 2019, making use of the former polar bear exhibit which opened as part of Northern Shores in 1987.

=== Rhino Building ===
This building opened in 1959 as the Pachyderm Habitat with four yards surrounding the building for Asian elephants, Malayan tapirs, and the former black rhinoceros and Nile hippopotamus. The elephants and tapirs were moved to Toyota Elephant Passage prior to its opening in 2012. In July 2025, it was announced that the zoo's last hippo "Mahali" would be transferred to a preserve in Texas in spring 2026, marking the end of the zoo keeping Nile hippopotamus. Cinereous vultures now reside in the former tapir yard and the former elephant yard has been renovated for a pair of white rhinoceros, after their last black rhino died.

=== Feline House ===
Feline House was built in 1964. The building is now closed and has been renovated in some areas to make way for Stingray Cove and outdoor yards have been repurposed for smaller species.

=== Traveling exhibits ===
Denver Zoo has hosted several traveling exhibits in recent years to raise awareness for conservation efforts. Traveling exhibits brought to the zoo have included "Nature Connects, Art With Lego Bricks," "Washed Ashore, Art to Save the Sea" and "Dinos! Live at Denver Zoo."

== Other facilities ==
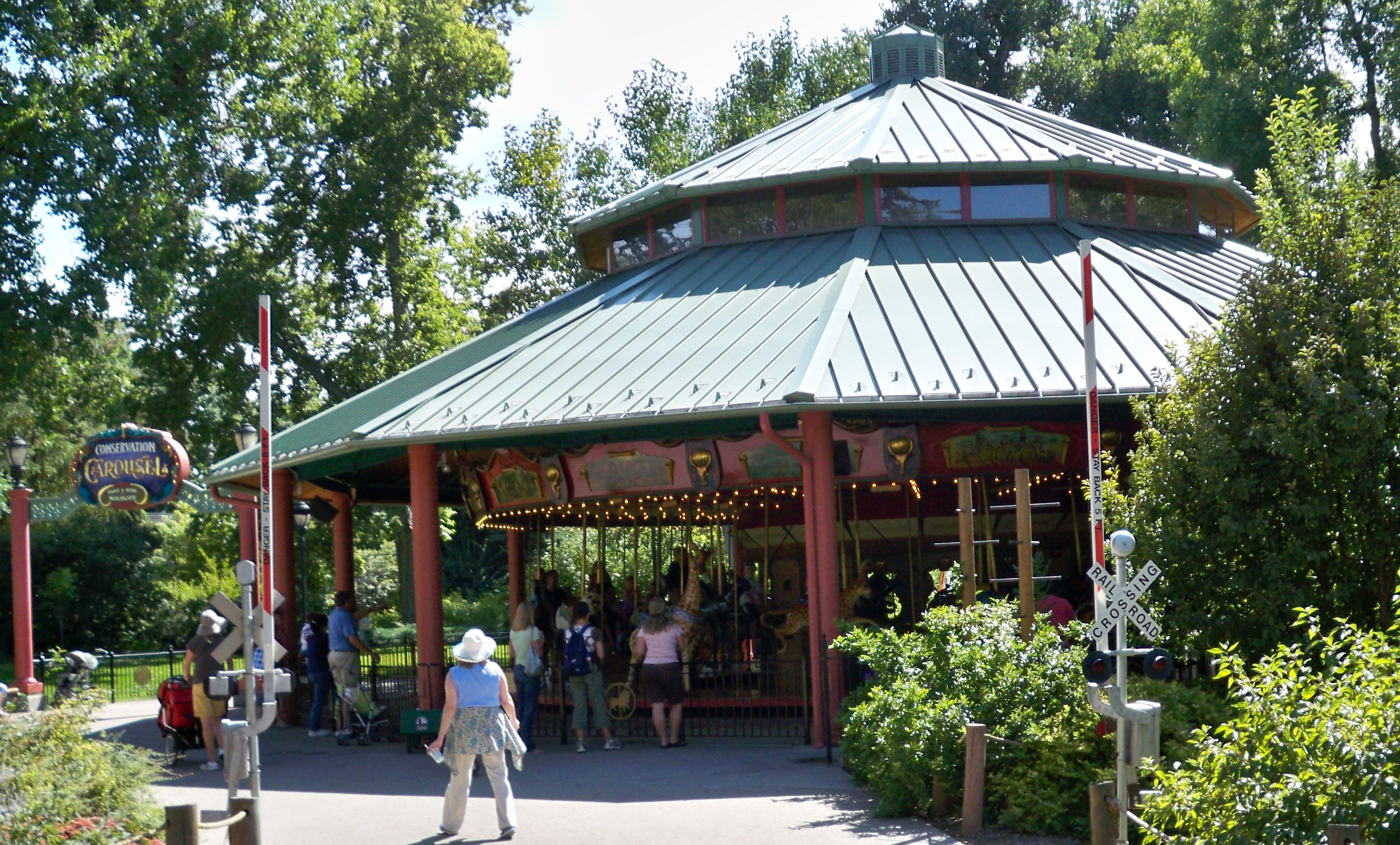
Endangered Species Carousel

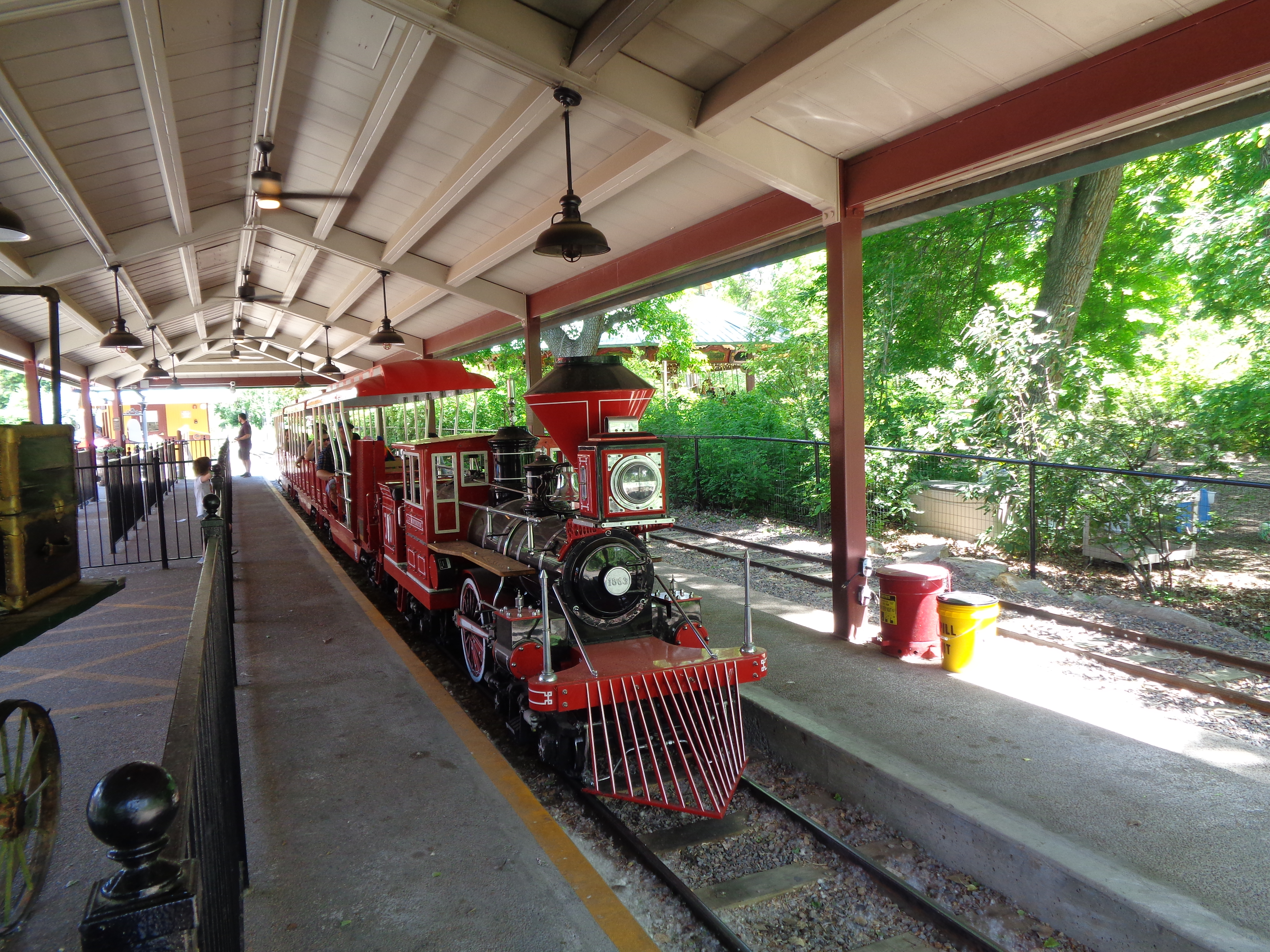
Train station at the zoo

The Helen and Arthur E. Johnson Animal Hospital was completed in 2021 and features one of the few CT scanners on an American zoo campus as well as double the space of the previous hospital built in 1969. The Schlessman Family Foundation Visitor and Education Center has windows onto a lab, surgical suite and treatment rooms allowing visitors to watch procedures. The hospital was honored by the Association of Zoos and Aquariums with a 2023 significant achievement in facilities award.

== Education and conservation ==
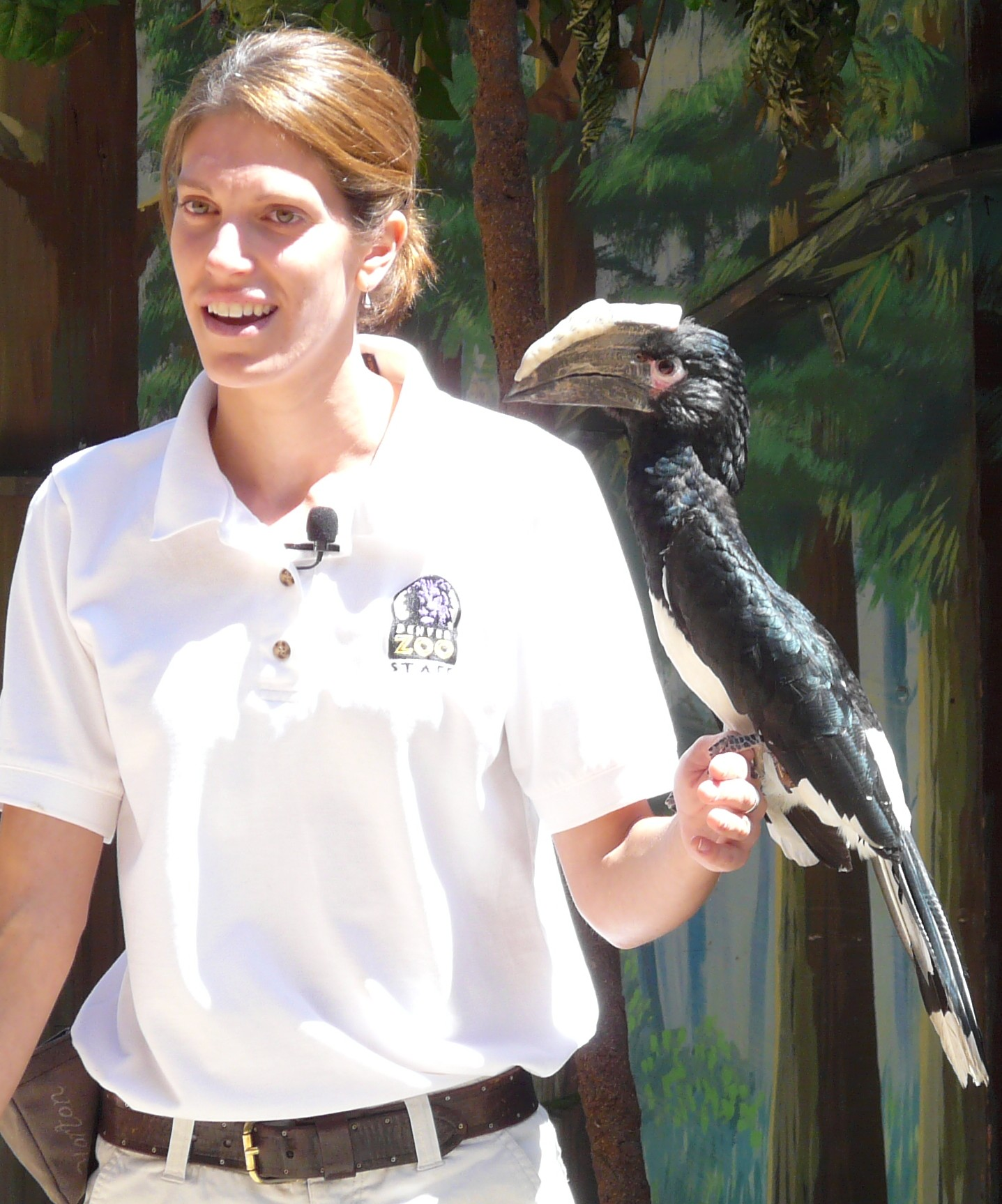
Trumpeter hornbill with zookeeper

Throughout the day Denver Zoo provides educational opportunities for visitors, including the sea lion demonstration, Toyota Elephant Passage demonstration, Predator Ridge demonstration, a variety of programming at both Wildlife Plaza and the Wild Encounters amphitheater as well as many other feedings/demonstrations. Some of these are seasonal and vary throughout the year.

In March 2023, Denver Zoo became the first zoo in Colorado to earn the Certified Autism Center designation from the International Board of Credentialing and Continuing Education Standards.

Denver Zoo is part of the (American) Association of Zoos and Aquariums (AZA) Species Survival Plan for many species. And as an active member of the World Association of Zoos and Aquariums (WAZA), Denver Zoo works with other zoos and aquariums around the world to respond to the global extinction crisis facing the world's frogs and other amphibians. Denver Zoo works with conservationists in Peru to save wild populations of the endangered Lake Titicaca frog and Lake Junin giant frog. Amphibian experts with the zoo have had rare success breeding boreal toads, listed as endangered in several western states, and have released over 600 young toads in southwestern Utah. In 2021, the zoo and Colorado Parks and Wildlife partnered to launch a program aimed at increasing the boreal toad population within Colorado. This has resulted in the release of over 2,800 tadpoles within Colorado as of 2024.

Denver Zoo also has a storied history with the American bison as it was one of the first zoos to assist in nationwide efforts to save the species from extinction. A breeding herd of five bison arrived at the zoo in 1899. The zoo no longer houses the species but manages a herd on the Rio Mora National Wildlife Refuge in New Mexico and also contributed animals to both the Genesee herd near Denver and the Heartland Ranch herd near Lamar. The latter herd, behaving naturally on thousands of acres and with the help of the Southern Plains Land Trust, has almost entirely returned the ecosystem to its natural state as of 2019.

In 2024, the zoo will begin using 570 acres in Weld County, donated by the Lembke family, as a breeding and reintroduction facility dubbed the Lembke Family Preserve. Phase One, to be finished by the end of the year, will see new facilities built for breeding programs and offer temporary animal holding in the event of habitat maintenance or renovations on the main campus. Phase Two will transform the land into a conservation center capable of reintroducing species, in Colorado and beyond, on a larger scale than previously possible.

Denver Zoo's conservation efforts are coordinated by the Department of Conservation Biology. Through continued research and funding, the Department helps to conserve a variety of species worldwide. Although the zoo has been active in conservation and research since its founding in 1896, the establishment of the Department of Conservation Biology provides dedicated staff and funding to support hundreds of projects throughout the world.
